= List of individual trees =

The following is a list of individual trees. Trees listed here are regarded as important or specific by their historical, national, locational, natural or mythological context. The list includes actual trees located throughout the world, as well as trees from myths and religions.

== Africa ==
=== Living ===
Image	Name	Species	Location	Age (years)	Notes
	Lost Tree	Acacia	Sahara desert 20.645°N 11.249°E	–	Isolated acacia tree, a landmark on the route across the Sahara.
	Wonderboom tree in Pretoria	Wonderboom (Ficus salicifolia)	Pretoria, South Africa; 25.6870°S 28.1918°E	–	A sprawling fig tree in Pretoria, South Africa.
	El Drago Milenario	Dragon tree (Dracaena draco)	Icod de los Vinos, Tenerife; 28.3666°N 16.72222°W	–	Local tourist attraction for more than a hundred years.
	Sunland Baobab	Baobab (Adansonia digitata)	Limpopo Province, South Africa; 23°37′16″S 30°11′53″E	1,060	A giant and ancient baobab tree, with a pub in the hollow.
	Sagole Baobab	Baobab (Adansonia digitata)	Near Tshipise, in Vendaland, Limpopo Province, South Africa; 22°30′00″S 30°38′00″E		Largest baobab in South Africa.
	Glencoe Baobab	Baobab (Adansonia digitata)	Hoedspruit, South Africa; 24°22′25″S 30°51′24″E	1,835	Stoutest and second largest baobab in South Africa
	Ombalantu baobab tree	Baobab (Adansonia digitata)	Outapi, Namibia; 17°30′43″S 14°59′16″E	800	Has served as a chapel, post office, house, and place of hiding.
	Post Office Tree	White milkwood (Sideroxylon inerme)	Mosselbay, South Africa; 34.180363°S 22.141382°E	c. 600	Acted as a "post office" in earlier times and now has a boot shaped postbox.
	Treaty Tree	White milkwood (Sideroxylon inerme)	Woodstock, Cape Town, South Africa; 33.92626°S 18.45130°E	c. 500	Site of a peace treaty in 1806.
	Big Tree in Chirinda Forest	Nyasa redwood (Khaya anthotheca)	Chirinda Forest, Zimbabwe; 20°26′29″S 32°42′15″E	1,000+	A National Monument of Zimbabwe. The tree is currently in the process of dying.

=== Historical ===
Image	Name	Species	Location	Age (years)	Notes
	Tree of Ténéré	Acacia	Sahara desert 17°45′00″N 10°04′00″E		A very isolated tree in the Sahara desert, notable before 1934, in Niger, destroyed in 1973.
	Panke Baobab	African baobab (Adansonia digitata)	Zimbabwe	2,419	Oldest documented non-clonal angiosperm. Tree fell in 2011.
	Chapman's Baobab	African baobab (Adansonia digitata)	Botswana		Found and named after James Chapman and marked by explorer David Livingstone. Tree fell in 2016.
	The Cotton Tree	Kapok (Ceiba pentandra)	Freetown, Sierra Leone; 8.4872°N 13.2356°W	~400	Historic symbol of Freetown. The tree fell during a rainstorm on 24 May 2023.

== Asia ==
=== Living ===
Image	Name	Species	Location	Age (years)	Notes
	Cypress of Abarkuh	Cypress (Cupressus sempervirens)	Abarkuh, Yazd Province, Iran	4,500	The second oldest living tree in the world.
	Thimmamma Marrimanu	Banyan (Ficus benghalensis)	Anantapur District, Andhra Pradesh, India	800	A clonal colony of Indian banyan with a crown area of over 4.7 acres. This is the largest tree in the world by crown area.
	Osmania Lifesaver	Tamarind (Tamarindus indica)	Osmania General Hospital campus, Hyderabad, Telangana, India	300	A large tamarind tree near the river Musi in Hyderabad. In 1908 150 people hung on to this tree for two full days amidst a severe flood. The tree stood strong and continues to do so after 110 years. The tree is currently over 300 years old.
	Wonder Balete	Balete tree	OISCA Farm in Canlaon, Philippines	1,300	The over 1,300-year-old balete tree (related to banyan trees) is probably the oldest known tree in the Philippines, as estimated by botanists from Silliman University.
	Five-Dollar Tree	Tembusu (Cyrtophyllum fragrans)	Singapore Botanic Gardens, Singapore	Over 200	The tree is pictured on the back of the Singaporean five-dollar bill, and is one of the Heritage trees in Singapore. It has a unique lower lateral branch, which makes it easily recognisable.
	Jaya Sri Maha Bodhi	Sacred fig (Ficus religiosa)	Anuradhapura, Sri Lanka; 8°20′41″N 80°23′48″E	2,300	A sacred fig propagated from the Bodhi Tree under which Buddha became enlightened. It was planted in 288 BC.
	Jōmon Sugi	Japanese cedar (Cryptomeria japonica)	Yakushima island, Japan; 30°21′40.76″N 130°31′55.81″E	–	Ancient specimen; one of the oldest trees on Yakushima.
	Great sugi of Kayano	Japanese cedar (Cryptomeria japonica)	Kaga, Ishikawa, Japan; 36°13′39″N 136°21′36″E	2,300	–
	Big Banyan Tree	Banyan (Ficus benghalensis)	Ramohalli, Bangalore, India; 12°54′34″N 77°23′44″E	400	–
	Tree of Life	Mesquite (Prosopis cineraria)	Bahrain; 25.994073°N 50.583235°E	400	–
	Rahmat tree	Oriental plane (Platanus orientalis)	Kermanshah, Kermanshahan Province, Iran	700	Located in the historical area of Taq Bostan.
	The Ying Ke Pine, Yingkesong	Huangshan pine (Pinus hwangshanensis)	Huangshan, China	Thought to be 1,500	Ying Ke, meaning "Welcoming-Guests" pine on Huangshan.
	Methuselah	Judean date palm (Phoenix dactylifera)	Ketura, Israel	21	The formerly extinct tree was sprouted from a 2,000-year-old seed.
	Sahabi Tree	Atlantic Pistachio (Pistacia atlantica)	Safawi, Jordan	1,500	Pistachio tree under which the Islamic prophet Muhammad supposedly sat.
	Takeshi Kaneshiro Tree (金城武樹)	Bishop wood (Bischofia javanica)	Chihshang, Taitung, Taiwan	About 40	Made famous by advertisements for EVA Air with Takeshi Kaneshiro made in June 2013 under this tree.
	King Cypress	Cypress (Cupressus gigantea)	Bayi District, Tibet	2,600	Estimated to be ~2,600 years old.
	Midh Ranjha Tree	Banyan (Ficus benghalensis)	Sargodha District, Punjab, Pakistan	600	Oldest known tree in Pakistan, associated with folk legend of Heer Ranjha.
	Menara	Yellow meranti	Danum Valley Conservation Area, Sabah, Malaysia on northern Borneo island	–	The tree is on a slope, and the reported 97.58 metres (320.1 ft) height. The world's tallest tropical tree.
	Great Banyan Tree	Banyan (Ficus benghalensis)	Acharya Jagadish Chandra Bose Indian Botanic Garden, Shibpur, Howrah, India	Over 200	
	Penderecki’s Tree	Gardenia (Gardenia sp.)	Lumphini Park, Bangkok, Thailand	~4	Commemorative tree planted in 2021 in honour of Polish composer Krzysztof Penderecki. It was planted by the Polish Ambassador and Bangkok officials and marked with a plaque directing to the Penderecki’s Garden project.

=== Historical ===
Image	Name	Species	Location	Age (years)	Notes
	The Bodhi Tree	Sacred fig (Ficus religiosa)	Bodh Gaya, India; 24°41′45.29″N 84°59′29.29″E	–	The tree under which Buddha obtained enlightenment. The current tree at the site is a replacement.
	Zuihuai	Pagoda tree (Styphnolobium japonicum)	Jingshan park 39°55′23.22″N 116°23′33.64″E		The tree on which the Chongzhen Emperor hanged himself shortly after escaping the Forbidden City in Beijing, China. The original tree died and was replaced by a replica.
	Changi Tree	Hopea sangal or Sindora wallichii	Singapore		A historical visual landmark located in Singapore. Thought to be a specimen of Sindora wallichii, with an estimated height of 75 metres (246 feet), it was filled with explosive charges during the Second World War to prevent its use as a ranging aide by the approaching Japanese artillery.
	Dry tree	Platanus orientalis	Northern Persia, possibly Tabriz or somewhere in Khorasan		According to a legend, the solitary Dry tree marked the spot of a great battle between Alexander the Great and Darius. Later recorded by Marco Polo.
	Cypress of Kashmar	Cypress	Kashmar, Khorasan Province, Persia 35°14′18″N 58°27′56″E		According to a legend, it has sprung from a branch brought by Zoroaster from Paradise.
	The Lone Pine	Turkish pine (Pinus brutia)	Gallipoli Peninsula, Turkey; 40°13′49.48″N 26°17′14.74″E		A solitary tree which marked the site of the Battle of Lone Pine in 1915.
	The Kalayaan Tree	Copperpod (Peltophorum pterocarpum)	Malolos Cathedral, Bulacan, Philippines		The Kalayaan Tree (Tree of Freedom), located near the front of the Minor Basilica of Our Lady of Immaculate Conception in the historic city of Malolos, Bulacan, Philippines. The siar tree was planted by Gen. Emilio Aguinaldo during a lull in the Malolos Convention. Under the tree is a monument symbolizing the meeting of Filipino revolutionaries represented by statues of Gregorio del Pilar and Gen. Isidoro Torres; Don Pablo Tecson, a legislator; Padre Mariano Sevilla, a nationalist leader of the church and Doña Basilia Tantoco, a woman freedom fighter.
	DMZ incident tree	Poplar (genus Populus)	Korean DMZ		A tree within the Korean DMZ was the focus of the axe murder incident, in which two United States Army officers were killed by North Korean soldiers. The killings led to Operation Paul Bunyan, named for the legendary lumberjack, in which the tree was eventually cut down under the watch of over 800 soldiers.

== Europe ==
=== Living ===
	Name	Species	Location	Age (years)	Notes
	Balderschwang Yew	Common yew (Taxus baccata)	Balderschwang, Bavaria, Germany	600-1,000	Possibly the oldest tree in Germany.
August 2025 Bildautor: Jürgen Blümle Bildrechte: Creative Commons		Sequoiadendron giganteum (Wellingtonia gigantea)	Reutlingen-Bronnweiler, Germany	~ 160	In 1864, King Wilhelm I had this sequoia planted in Bronnweiler because there were too many seeds left over for the Wilhelma. Circumference: 7 m at a height of 1.3 m (measured in Aug. 2025); Height: estimated at approx. 38 m; Crown diameter: approx. 15 m. Designated a natural monument since 1993.
An ancient, wide-trunked oak tree covered in green moss, featuring thick, twisting branches and iron bands wrapped around its trunk for support.	Clachan Oak	Sessile oak (Quercus petraea)	Balfron, Scotland	500–600	Possibly Stirlingshire's oldest tree. It is said that William Wallace rested at, and Rob Roy hid in this tree.
	Zagrade chinar	Plane (Platanus orientalis)	Garmen, Bulgaria 41° 35′ 53.2″ N, 23° 47′ 55.13″ E	600+	One of the oldest living trees in Bulgaria, symbol of Garmen municipality and officially registered and protected since 1968.
	Linden Tree of King Matthias	Large-leaved lime (Tilia platyphyllos)	Bojnice, Slovakia	700+	One of the oldest trees in Slovakia. Located in the gardens of the Bojnice Castle.
	Defynnog Yew	Common yew (Taxus baccata)	Defynnog, Wales	c. 2,500	A landmark tree in St Cynog's Church, Defynnog churchyard.
	Bicycle Tree	Sycamore (Acer pseudoplatanus)	Brig o' Turk, Scotland	c. 110–150	A landmark tree with a bicycle embedded within it.
The Bridegroom's Oak (Bräutigamseiche) in Germany	Bridegroom's Oak	Pedunculate oak (Quercus robur)	Eutin, Schleswig-Holstein, Germany	500+	A registered national monument that has its own postal address with a public letter box for people trying to find love.
	Brimmon Oak	Pedunculate oak (Quercus robur)	Newtown, Powys, Wales	c. 500	A campaign to save it forced the diversion of the A483 Newtown Bypass.
	Birnam Oak	Sessile oak (Quercus petraea)	Birnam, Perth and Kinross, Scotland	c. 600	Mentioned in Shakespeare's Macbeth. Several of its branches are propped up to prevent them from collapsing, but the tree is still alive.
	Lime in Leliceni	Small-leaved lime (Tilia cordata)	Leliceni, Romania	c. 500	It was named the European Tree of the Year in 2011.
	Old Lime Tree of Felsőmocsolád	Lime (Tilia sp.)	Felsőmocsolád, Hungary	400	It was named the European Tree of the Year in 2012.
	Old Tjikko	Norway spruce (Picea abies)	Dalarna, Sweden; 61°35′N 12°40′E	9,568	The oldest known individual clonal tree in the world.
	Oliveira do Mouchão	Olive (Olea europaea)	Mouriscas, Portugal; 39.473217°N 8.080930°W	3,350	The oldest known olive tree in the world (with an estimate age precision of 2%).
	Stara Maslina	Olive (Olea europaea)	Bar, Montenegro; 42°04′48″N 19°07′46″E	2,240	
	Craigends Yew	Common yew (Taxus baccata)	Grounds of the old Craigends estate, Houston, Renfrewshire, Scotland; 55.862413°N 4.5262771°W	>700	Largest layering yew tree in Scotland, with a 100-metre circumference of the crown.
	Fortingall Yew	Common yew (Taxus baccata)	Churchyard of Fortingall, Perthshire, Scotland; 56.598158°N 4.051007°W	2,000–5,000	Various estimates have put its age at between 2,000 and 5,000 years.
	Florence Court Yew	Irish yew (Taxus baccata 'Fastigiata')	Florence Court estate near Enniskillen, Fermanagh, Northern Ireland; 54.261004°N 7.727313°W	259	The survivor of the original pair of Irish yew saplings discovered on Cuilcagh mountain in 1767, this specimen was transplanted to the gardens at Florence Court in the same year. Almost all Irish yews worldwide are believed to derive from this tree following its commercial propagation after 1820.
	Fuck Tree	Sessile oak (Quercus petraea)	Hampstead Heath, London	Unknown; used since at least the 19th-century	A tree located in an established gay cruising area, noted for its slender trunk which facilitates gay sex.
	Bermiego Yew	Common yew (Taxus baccata)	Bermiego, Asturias, Spain; 43.200930°N 5.984258°W	c. 2,000	Considered one of the oldest yews in Europe.
	Caesarsboom (Caesar's Tree)	Common yew (Taxus baccata)	Lo, Belgium; 50.98028°N 2.74554°E		Noted for the legend that Julius Caesar tethered his horse to it during his conquest of the region.
	The Old Elm	Field elm (Ulmus minor)	Center of Sliven, Bulgaria	1,100	It won the 2014 European Tree of the Year Award. The tree has sat in the center of Sliven for 1100 years, serving as a gathering point and a historical marker. It is also part of the city coat of arms.
	Granit Oak	Pedunculate oak (Quercus robur)	Granit village near Stara Zagora, Bulgaria; 42.254067°N 25.136080°E	1,681	One of the oldest trees in Europe, estimated to be about 1,650 years old. Its crown spread covers an area of 1,017 square metres, its girth is 7.45 m, and its height is 23.4 m.
	Allerton Oak	Sessile oak (Quercus petraea)	Calderstones Park, Liverpool, England; 53.3826°N 2.8928°W	1,000	English Tree of the Year in 2019.
	Bartek	Oak	Zagnańsk, Świętokrzyskie, Poland; 50°59′N 20°40′E	650–670	A famous tree in Poland, visited by kings, said to be about 1,200 years old (actually 650–670 years according to recent studies). It is 30 m tall, 13.5 m in girth near the ground, with a crown spread of 40 m.
	Sobieski Oak	Pedunculate oak, (Quercus robur)	Racibórz, Rudy Landscape Park, Poland 50°7′45.85″N 18°16′26.70″E	Over 400	It is the thickest and oldest tree in Racibórz, the Łężczok nature reserve, and one of the three oldest and most magnificent trees in the Rudy Landscape Park.
	Gernikako Arbola	Oak	Guernica, Basque Country, Spain; 43°18′53″N 2°40′47″W	11	An oak representing the Basque people. The original tree was planted in the 14th century, the current tree is the fifth in the dynasty.
	Queen Elizabeth Oak	Sessile oak (Quercus petraea)	Cowdray Park, West Sussex, England	800–1,000	
	Darley Oak	Pedunculate oak (Quercus robur)	Darleyford, Cornwall, England; 50.53396°N 4.43382°W	1,000+	Folk tradition attributes healing properties to the tree.
	Kongeegen ("King Oak")	Pedunculate oak (Quercus robur)	Jægerspris Nordskov, Sjælland, Denmark; 55°54′37″N 11°59′21″E	1,500 – 2,000	The oldest tree in Denmark.
	Chêne chapelle	Pedunculate oak (Quercus robur)	Allouville-Bellefosse, Normandy, France; 49°35′47″N 0°40′35″E	1,200	An 800- to 1,200-year-old pedunculate oak, under which William the Conqueror is to have stopped, according to a local legend. There are two chapels inside.
	Dinoša mulberry tree	Mulberry tree (Morus (plant))	Dinoša, Montenegro]		Mulberry tree in Dinoša that spouts water following heavy rainfall.
	Gilwell Oak	Pedunculate oak (Quercus robur)	Gilwell Park, Epping Forest, Essex, England; 51°39′1″N 0°0′8″E	circa 500	Oak tree associated with the early history of the Scout Association
	Ivenack Oak	Pedunculate oak (Quercus robur)	Ivenack, Mecklenburg-Western Pomerania, Germany	800	A huge and ancient pedunculate oak thought to be about 800 years old, 35 m tall, 11 m in girth at breast height and 16.5 m near the ground. The largest oak in Germany and (in wood volume) probably in Europe.
	Baikushev's pine	Bosnian pine (Pinus heldreichii)	Pirin mountains, near Bansko, Bulgaria	1,300	An ancient tree estimated to be 1,300 years old. It is one of the oldest trees of Bulgaria and stands 24 m tall with a girth of 6.9 m at breast height.
	Stelmužė Oak	Pedunculate oak (Quercus robur)	Stelmužė, Zarasai district, Lithuania; 55.8299811°N 26.2175894°E	1,500	Measures a girth at breast height of 9.58 m and 13 m near the ground. The oldest tree in Lithuania and the Baltic States.
	Hundred Horse Chestnut	Sweet chestnut (Castanea sativa)	Sant'Alfio, the eastern slope of Mount Etna, Sicily; 37°45′00.7″N 15°7′49.4″E	2,000–4,000	Probably the world's oldest and largest chestnut.
	Bialbero de Casorzo ("Double tree of Casorzo")	Outer: Mulberry Inner: Cherry tree	Grana, Piedmont, Italy		A tree which grows in a hollow tree near Grana, Piemont, Italy.
	Napoleon's plane tree	London plane (Platanus × hispanica)	Alessandria, Piedmont, Italy	Over 200	A monumental plane tree traditionally associated with Napoleon Bonaparte and the Battle of Marengo. Its trunk has a girth of approximately 7.6 m.
	Chestnut tree of Melle	Sweet chestnut (Castanea sativa)	Melle, Piedmont, Italy	~300	A monumental chestnut tree standing 32 m tall, with a trunk circumference of 9.6 m. One of the last surviving cultivated chestnut trees in the Varaita Valley, locally known as Tabudiera 'd Titta.
	Lime tree of Macugnaga	Large-leaved lime (Tilia platyphyllos)	Macugnaga, Piedmont, Italy	Unknown (estimated at 200–500+)	A monumental lime tree with a trunk circumference of 8.3 m, regarded as a symbol of the local Walser community. According to tradition, it was planted by Walser settlers in the 13th century.
	Olive tree of Vouves	Olive (Olea europaea)	Ano Vouves, Kolymvari, Crete, Greece; 35°29′12″N 23°47′13″E	2,000	It is confirmed to be at least 2,000 years old based on tree ring analysis, but it is claimed to be between 3,000 and 4,000 years old.
	Hungry Tree	London plane (Platanus × hispanica).	In the grounds of the King's Inns in Dublin, Ireland	80 approx	The Hungry Tree is an otherwise unremarkable specimen of the London plane, which has become known for having partially consumed a nearby park bench.
Oak Fabrykant in Poland	Fabrykant Oak	Pendunculate oak (Quercus robur)	Łódź. Poland	165 approx	The 2023 winner of European Tree of the Year and the 2022 winner of Tree of the Year by Klub Gaja.
	Flower Square oak	Pedunculate oak (Quercus robur)	Belgrade, Serbia	~200	Around two centuries old, the last remaining of the forest that covered the area.
	Oak at the Gate of the Dead	Pedunculate oak (Quercus robur)	Near Wrexham, Wales	Circa 1,000	Sited on the burial ground of the 1165 Battle of Crogen
	Saint Maelruan's Tree	Persian walnut (Juglans regia)	St Mary's Priory, Tallaght, County Dublin, Ireland	~266	A sprawling, multi-trunked tree, with a circumference of 150 feet (46 m). Reputedly planted by Saint Máel Ruain (died 792), the tree more likely dates from after 1760. It was damaged by a storm in 1797, causing it to split in half.
	Midland Oak	Oak	Leamington Spa, Warwickshire, England; 52.300062°N 1.529750°W	38	Reputed to mark the centre of England. Grown from an acorn from the original tree.
	Najevnik Lime Tree	Small-leaved lime (Tilia cordata)	Najevnik Farm in Ludranski Vrh, Črna na Koroškem, northern Slovenia	~700	The tree with the largest girth in Slovenia (10.70 meters; its height is 24 m). Estimated to be 700 years old. The traditional meeting place of Slovene politicians and a cultural venue.
	Tamme-Lauri oak	Pedunculate oak (Quercus robur)	Urvaste Parish, Võru County, Estonia 57°55′ 2″ N, 26° 34′ 36″ E	690	Thickest and oldest tree in Estonia.
	Orissaare Stadium oak	Pedunculate oak (Quercus robur)	Orissaare, Saare County, Estonia; 58°33′32.2″N 23°4′49″E		Grows in the middle of Orissaare stadium. European Tree of the Year 2015
	Waldtraut	Douglas fir (Pseudotsuga menziesii)	Arboretum Freiburg-Günterstal near Freiburg im Breisgau, Germany	116	Tallest tree in Germany with a height of 66.58 meters in 2017
	Sobreiro Monumental	Cork oak (Quercus suber)	Águas de Moura, Portugal; 39.473216°N 8.080946°W	243	Verified by the Guinness Book of Records as the largest cork oak in the world.
	Eucalipto do Vale de Canas	Karri (Eucalyptus diversicolor)	Coimbra, Portugal	145	Tallest tree in Europe at 72.9 metres (239 ft).
Linner Linde	Linner Linde	Large-leaved lime (Tilia platyphyllos)	Linn, Switzerland	Circa 800	Largest tree in the Canton of Aargau. According to legend, it was planted in times of plague by one of the last living villagers.
	The Suffrage Oak	Hungarian Oak (Quercus frainetto)	Glasgow, Scotland	108	Oak tree planted by Scottish suffragist groups to mark the beginning of the right to vote for some women.
	Latoon fairy bush	Common hawthorn (Crataegus monogyna)	Junction 11 of the M18 motorway, Latoon, County Clare, Ireland	–	Held up the construction of a motorway in the late 1990s owing to its supernatural significance
	Ekeby oak tree	Pedunculate oak (Quercus robur)	Ekerö, Stockholm County, Sweden	Circa 500	Largest deciduous tree in Sweden by volume, declared a natural monument in 1956.
	Rumskulla oak	Pedunculate oak (Quercus robur)	Vimmerby, Kalmar County, Sweden	Over 1,000	Oldest non-clonal tree in Sweden.
	Ankerwycke Yew	Common yew (Taxus baccata)	Wraysbury, Berkshire, England	1,400 – 2,500	Said to have been witness to the sealing of Magna Carta and is one of the places where Henry VIII may have courted Anne Boleyn.
	Silken Thomas Yew	Common yew (Taxus baccata)	Maynooth, County Kildare, Ireland	~800	According to the Irish Tree Council, it is believed that Silken Thomas (1513–1537) "played a lute under the boughs of the tree the night before he surrendered to King Henry VIII." Contender for Ireland's oldest tree.
	Geneva official chestnut tree	Horse chestnut (Aesculus hippocastanum)	Geneva, Switzerland	10	Tree whose leaf buds mark the beginning of spring in Geneva and which serves as a record of climate change.
	Bethnal Green mulberry tree	Black mulberry (Morus nigra)	Bethnal Green in the London Borough of Tower Hamlets, England	200–500	Possibly the oldest black mulberry in the United Kingdom
	Old Man of Calke	Pedunculate oak (Quercus robir)	Calke Abbey, Ticknall, Derbyshire, England	1,000	Possibly oldest in the estate. A 800-year-old oak lies a few metres away.
	Kett's Oak	Pedunculate oak (Quercus robir)	Between Wymondham and Hethersett, Norfolk, England		The men led by Robert Kett, who marched on Norwich in the 1549 rebellion, gathered under the tree.

=== Historical ===
Image	Name	Species	Location	Age (years)	Notes
	Merlin's Oak	Oak	Carmarthen, Wales		
	Anne Frank Tree	Horse-chestnut (Aesculus hippocastanum)	City center of Amsterdam, Netherlands; 52°22′30.7″N 4°53′4.7″E		Featured in Anne Frank's The Diary of a Young Girl. The tree was destroyed in a gale in the late summer of 2010.
	Glastonbury Thorn	Common hawthorn (Crataegus monogyna)			Reputed to have been planted by Joseph of Arimathea.
	Donar's Oak	Oak			A tree sacred to the Germanic tribe of the Chatti, ancestors of the Hessians.
	Sacred tree at Uppsala		Temple at Uppsala, Sweden		It was a sacred tree venerated by Norse pagans, still extant in the second half of the 11th century.
	Royal Oak	Pedunculate oak (Quercus robur)	Boscobel, England		King Charles II hid in the tree to escape the Roundheads following the Battle of Worcester in 1651. The tree has been replaced by a descendant.
	Shakespeare's mulberry tree	Mulberry	New Place, Stratford-upon-Avon, England		Cut down in the mid-18th century and fashioned into mementos.
	Tree of Hippocrates	Oriental plane (Platanus orientalis)	Kos, Greece		The tree under which Hippocrates is supposed to have taught.
	Danger Tree		Beaumont-Hamel, France		Marks the area of highest casualties suffered by the Royal Newfoundland Regiment during their attack at Beaumont Hamel during the Battle of the Somme. The current 'tree' is a concrete replica, however growth around the replica may be from the same root system as the original tree.
	Takovo bush	Pedunculate oak (Quercus robur)	Takovo, Serbia		Tree under which Miloš Obrenović started the Second Serbian Uprising.
The Bridal Oak (Brureika) in Norway	Bridal Oak	English Oak (Quercus robur)	Hardanger, Norway	800–1000	An oak tree where bridal gatherings came after a marriage.
	Pine of Tsar Dušan	Bosnian pine (Pinus heldreichii)	Uroševac, Serbia	663	Planted in 1336 by Tsar Dušan, destroyed by Albanian extremists in 1999.
	Pi de les Tres Branques	Scots pine (Pinus sylvestris)	Catalonia, Spain		Regarded as symbolising the unity of the Catalan countries.
	Poplar of Horror	Poplar	Gradina Donja, Bosnia and Herzegovina		Used for mass executions of inmates of the Jasenovac concentration camp.
	Buttington Oak	Pedunculate oak (Quercus robur)	Buttington, Powys, Wales		Said to have been planted to commemorate the Battle of Buttington in 893. Fell in February 2018.
	Robin Hood's Larder	Oak	Sherwood Forest		Reputed to have been used by Robin Hood to store food. It was badly burnt by fire in the late 19th century and again in 1913. It finally fell in a gale in 1961 and no trace of it remains.
	Sycamore Gap Tree	Sycamore (Acer pseudoplatanus)	Northumberland, England	Circa 150	Standing next to Hadrian's Wall in a dramatic dip in the landscape, it was a popular photographic subject and featured in the 1991 film Robin Hood: Prince of Thieves. It was illegally felled on 28 September 2023 in what Northumbria Police described as "an act of vandalism".
	Caton Oak	Oak	Caton, England		Reputed to have been a sacred tree for druids, the tree declined during the 20th century, so an acorn from it was planted in 2007 to grow a replacement. The original tree fell on 20 June 2016.
	The Happy Man Tree	London plane (Platanus × hispanica)	Hackney, London, England; 51.5720179°N 0.0904784°W	150	England's Tree of the Year 2020 and subject of a dispute with property developer Berkeley Group Holdings. Cut down in January 2021.
	Sequoia of Vitoria-Gasteiz	Sequoia (Sequoiadendron giganteum)	Vitoria-Gasteiz, Basque Country, Spain; 42.846584°N 2.678167°W	154	Symbol of the city. Died in 2014.
	Major Oak	Pedunculate oak (Quercus robur)	Sherwood Forest, Nottinghamshire, England; 53°12′17″N 1°4′20.80″W	800	The most famous and most visited tree of Great Britain. About 800 years old, with a girth at breast height of 10.5 m. Pronounced dead in June 2026.

== North America ==
=== Living ===
Image	Name	Species	Location	Age (years)	Notes
	100 gecs Tree	Ponderosa pine (Pinus ponderosa)	Des Plaines, USA; 42.0302°N 87.9122°W	Unknown	Used as a pilgrimage site by fans of the band 100 Gecs.
	Árbol del Tule	Montezuma cypress (Taxodium mucronatum)	Santa María del Tule, Mexico; 17°02′47.4″N 96°38′10″W	1,433–1,600 years (est)	The stoutest tree in the world, with a circumference of 42.0 m (137.8 ft) and a diameter of 14.05 m (46.1 ft). In 2001 it was placed on a UNESCO tentative list of World Heritage Sites.
	Allen Russell	Giant sequoia (Sequoiadendron giganteum)	Balch Park, USA		The 33rd largest tree worldwide, named in dedication to park ranger Allen I. Russell.
	Angel Oak	Southern live oak (Quercus virginiana)	Johns Island, USA; 32°43′4″N 80°4′46″W	400–500	It stands 66.5 ft (20.3 m) tall, is 28 ft (8.5 m) in circumference, and its shade covers 17,200 ft^{2} (1,600 m^{2}). Its longest branch is 187 ft (57 m). The tree and surrounding park have been owned by the neighboring city of Charleston since 1991.
	Bennett Juniper	Grand juniper (Juniperus grandis)	Stanislaus National Forest, USA; 38°18′32″N 119°47′49.56″W	2,000–6,000 (est.)	The largest known juniper in the United States.
	Big Lonely Doug	Douglas fir (Pseudotsuga menziesii)	Near Port Renfrew, Vancouver Island, British Columbia, Canada; 48.5627°N 124.4189°W	1,000 years (est.)	A large Douglas fir that survived clear-cut logging in the 2010s and has since become a symbol of old-growth forest conservation on Vancouver Island.
	The Big Oak	Southern live oak (Quercus virginiana)	Thomasville, USA; 30.841114°N 83.981721°W		One of the oldest live oak trees east of the Mississippi River.
	The Big Tree – Goose Island	Southern live oak (Quercus virginiana)	Rockport, USA; 28.15252°N 96.97665°W	1,000–2,000 years (est.)	Located in Goose Island State Park.
The Big Tree in Springtime	The Big Tree – Columbia	Burr oak (Quercus macrocarpa)	Columbia, USA; 38°53′57.52″N 92°27′52.57″W	~400	Tied for largest of its species. The tree stands 27 m (89 ft) high, has a crown 40 m (130 ft) wide, and a trunk 7.5 ft (2.3 m) in diameter.
	Boyington Oak	Southern live oak (Quercus virginiana)	Mobile, USA; 30.68608°N 88.05153°W	191	Reportedly grew from the grave of Charles Boyington in the potter's field just outside the walls of Church Street Graveyard. Boyington was tried and executed for the murder of his friend, Nathaniel Frost, on 20 February 1835. He stated that a tree would spring from his grave as proof of his innocence.
	Buttonball Tree	American sycamore (Platanus occidentalis)	Sunderland, USA; 42°28′07.83″N 72°34′42.14″W	350–400 (est.)	Large tourist attraction of the town; the tree is believed to be the largest tree of its kind on the East Coast, or as locals put it, "The widest tree this side of the Mississippi." This tree's measurements are: circumference 25 feet (7.6 m); height 111 feet (34 m); average spread 140 feet (43 m).
	Candler Oak Tree	Oak	Savannah, USA; 32.0676°N 81.0963°W	~300	A Georgia Landmark and Historic Tree. It is owned by the Savannah Law School which protects the tree with fences and security surveillance. The tree serves as the law school's logo.
	Chandelier Tree	Coast redwood (Sequoia sempervirens)	Leggett, USA	~2,000	A coast redwood with a passage for cars cut through. It is 276-foot (84 m) high and 16-foot (4.9 m) ft. in diameter. The name "Chandelier Tree" comes from its unique limbs that resemble a chandelier.
	Central Guanacaste	Guanacaste tree (Enterolobium cyclocarpum)	Guanacaste National Park, Belize		The focal point of Guanacaste National Park
	Circus Trees	Various	Gilroy Gardens, Gilroy, USA		A group of trees shaped into artistic forms by arborist Axel Erlandson.
	Comfort Maple	Sugar maple (Acer saccharum)	Pelham, Canada	500	A 24.5-metre (80 ft) tall, approximately 500-year-old sugar maple.
	Council Oak Tree	Oak	Hollywood, USA		A historic oak tree on the Hollywood Seminole Indian Reservation that was added to the National Register of Historic Places in 2012.
	Creek Council Oak Tree	White oak	Tulsa, USA		A large oak tree marking the founding of Tulsa by the Lochapoka Clan of the Creek Nation in 1836. Listed in the National Register of Historic Places.
	Crooked Trees	Aspen	RM of Douglas, Canada; 52°52′16″N 107°32′13″W		A deformed grove of trembling aspen
	Davie Poplar	Tulip poplar (Liriodendron tulipifera)	Chapel Hill, USA	300–375	A large tree on the campus of the University of North Carolina at Chapel Hill, it was named in honor of Revolutionary War general and founder of the university William Richardson Davie. Many legends are associated with the tree.
	Devil's Tree	Oak	Bernards Township, USA		The tree is said to be cursed. Local legend says those who damage or disrespect the tree will soon thereafter come to some sort of harm, often in the form of a car accident or major breakdown as they leave.
	Dewey Oak	White oak (Quercus alba)	Granby, USA	250–450	The Town of Granby, Connecticut uses an outline of this tree as their town seal, and Connecticut's Notable Trees uses a photo of it on their certificates. This tree was damaged in the October 2011 snow storm (Storm Alfred), but it is still alive. This tree's measurements are: circumference 20.5 ft (6.2 m) height 78 ft (24 m) average spread 129 ft (39 m).
	Doerner Fir	Coast Douglas-fir	Coos County. Oregon, USA	350–400	One of tallest non-redwoods. 325.8 feet tall.
	Duffie Oak	Southern live oak (Quercus virginiana)	Mobile, USA	300	It is estimated to be at least 300 years old and has a circumference of 30 feet 11 inches (9.42 m), a height of 48 feet (15 m) and a spread of 126 feet (38 m). Scholars consider it to be the oldest living landmark in the city.
	El Arbolito		Managua, Nicaragua	20	A traditional landmark used to give directions in Managua.
	El Palo Alto	Coast redwood (Sequoia sempervirens)	Palo Alto, USA	1085–1086	A 110-foot (30 meter) tall coast redwood that is the namesake of the city of Palo Alto.
	Emancipation Oak	Southern live oak (Quercus virginiana)	Hampton, USA		On the campus of Hampton University, it is 98 feet (30 m) in diameter, with branches which extend upward as well as laterally. It is designated one of the 10 Great Trees of the World by the National Geographic Society and is part of the National Historic Landmark district of Hampton University.
	Endicott Pear Tree	European pear (Pyrus communis)	Danvers, USA; 42°32′54″N 70°55′48″W	about 375	Planted by Massachusetts Bay Colony Governor John Endecott in the 1630s or 1640s, this tree is believed to be the oldest cultivated fruit tree in North America.
	Fairfield Poplar	Plains cottonwood poplar (Populus deltoides subsp.monilifera)	Lethbridge, Alberta, Canada	~120	Planted by the first superintendent of the Dominion Experimental Farm, Dr. William H. Fairfield, as part of a broader effort to populate the surface of the prairie with trees.
	Friendship Oak	Southern live oak (Quercus virginiana)	Long Beach, USA; 30.210637°N 89.080994°W	500	A large tree on the Gulf Park campus of the University of Southern Mississippi, 59 feet (18 m) tall with a trunk diameter of 5.75 feet (1.75 m) and circumference of 19.8 feet (6.0 m).
	General Grant Tree	Giant sequoia (Sequoiadendron giganteum)	Kings Canyon National Park, USA		The "Nation's Christmas tree" of the United States.
	General Sherman Tree	Giant sequoia (Sequoiadendron giganteum)	Sequoia National Park, USA	2300–2700	The world's largest single living tree by volume, with an estimated 52,508 cu ft (1,487 m^{3}) of wood in its trunk.
	Gloomy Night Tree (Árbol de la Noche Victoriosa)	Montezuma cypress (Taxodium mucronatum)	Tacuba, Mexico		An old tree where Hernán Cortés allegedly mourned after being expelled from Tenochtitlan before taking the city by force.
	Goshin	Chinese juniper (Juniperus chinensis)	Washington, D.C., USA	~65	A bonsai forest planting of eleven junipers donated to the National Bonsai Foundation in 1984, displayed since at the United States National Arboretum.
	Grayson Elm	American elm (Ulmus americana)	Amherst, USA	200	This impressive elm with octopus-like limbs is located near the UMass Amherst campus. Writing under the pseudonym David Grayson, Ray Stannard Baker (1870–1946) penned the book Under My Tree about this elm. According to Digital Amherst, a project of the Jones Library (the public library of Amherst, Massachusetts), Ray Stannard Baker "purchased the meadow [where the elm was located] in order to save the tree. About the elm he wrote, 'It is content. It does not weep with remorse over its past, nor tremble for its future. It flings its loveliness to the sky, it is content with spring; it is glorious in summer, it is patient through the long winter.'" As of 2017, this tree's measurements are: circumference 17 feet (5.2 m); height 80 feet (24 m).
	Great Elm at Phillips Academy	American elm (Ulmus americana)	Andover, USA	200+	This American elm tree is located on the Phillips Academy campus in Andover, MA. Phillips Academy was founded in 1778 and the tree is estimated to be 200 to 300 years old. Tree measurements as of November 2019: circumference of 21 feet; spread over 100 feet; height estimated at 65 feet.
	Great Tree, also known as The Unity Tree and the Grandmother Tree.	Douglas Fir (Pseudotsuga menziesii var. menziesii)	Isis Oasis Sanctuary, Geyserville, USA	470 (+/- 125)	Large anomalous multi-trunked Douglas Fir, aged by naturalist Luther Burbank as being 350–450 years old in 1905. Official Sonoma County Heritage Tree #51. On the grounds of Isis Oasis Sanctuary in Geyserville, California, previously the site of the Baháʼí Summer School. Known to be used as a source of resin for waterproofing local Pomo baskets. Highway 101 was rerouted around Geyserville due to the presence of the tree.
	Hangman's Elm	English elm (Ulmus minor 'Atinia')	Manhattan, USA	~310	The oldest known tree in Manhattan. Located in Washington Square Park, it stands 110 feet (34 m) tall and has a diameter of 56 inches (1.4 m). 40.7319444444°N 73.9986111111°W
	Hare Krishna Tree	American elm (Ulmus americana)	East Village, Manhattan, USA		The founding site of the Hare Krishna movement in the United States.
	Harris Creek Sitka Spruce	Sitka spruce (Picea sitchensis)	Port Renfrew, B.C., Canada; 48.67921°N 124.21418°W		At 4 metres (13 ft) in diameter, it is not the largest Sitka spruce on Vancouver Island, but is easily accessible due to the paving of a former logging road, and has become well-known: hikers going by on the Harris Creek Main trail are recommended by trail guide books to make a short detour to visit it. Can be reached by wheel-chair-accessible short trail from Pacific Marine Road, from small sign on right hand side of road going northeast, about 20 km north-east of Port Renfrew, or 8 km past Lizard Lake. Logging in this area was permanently restricted by a 2012 vote.
	Hyperion	Coast redwood (Sequoia sempervirens)	Redwood National Park, USA		The tallest living tree in the world, measured 115.5 m tall when found in 2006. It reached 116.07 metres (380.8 ft) in 2019. The second and third tallest trees, both coastal redwoods, were also found in Redwood National Park in 2006, and named Helios (114.7 metres (376 ft)) and Icarus (113.1 metres (371 ft)).
	I-17 Mystery Christmas Tree	One-seed juniper (Juniperus monosperma)	Yavapai County, USA		A tree in the median of Interstate 17 annually decorated for Christmas.
	International World War Peace Tree	Linden tree	Darmstadt, USA	114	A tree planted by German American immigrants, it was dedicated at the end of World War I as a reminder of Germany's armistice with the United States and a sign of loyalty to America.
	Iluvatar	Coast redwood (Sequoia sempervirens)	Prairie Creek Redwoods State Park, USA		The third largest known coast redwood.
	Jardine Juniper	Rocky Mountain juniper (Juniperus scopulorum)	Logan Canyon, Cache National Forest, USA	~1500	Notable for its age, it was named after USAC alumnus and former US Secretary of Agriculture William Marion Jardine.
	Keeler Oak	White oak (Quercus alba)	Mansfield Township, USA	~300	A sign posted near the tree states: "This 300 year old tree was witness to the Colonial troops and Hessian soldiers as they marched through Black Horse down to Petticoat Bridge where a famous skirmish took place during the Revolutionary War. The tree is affectionately named for the previous owners of the farm where it now stands and serves as the Mansfield Township logo." It is approximately 22.5 feet in circumference at chest height.
	Kile Oak Tree	Bur oak (Quercus macrocarpa)	Irvington, USA	300–500	Landmark in the historic district of Irvington, and one of the oldest trees in the city of Indianapolis.
	Lanier's Oak	Southern live oak (Quercus virginiana)	Brunswick, Georgia, USA; 31.1558°N 81.4791°W	Unknown	Location where poet Sidney Lanier was inspired to write the poem "The Marshes of Glynn"
	Le Chêne à Papineau	Northern red oak (Quercus rubra)	Montebello, Canada		Estimated 300 years old and 20 m tall, it is one of the oldest known trees in Quebec.
	Linden Oak	White oak (Quercus alba)	North Bethesda, USA	~300	A large tree with a height of 97 feet (30 m) and a crown spread of 132 feet (40 m) as measured in February 2008 by the Maryland Big Tree Program. 39.0227679167°N 77.1022224444°W
	Lone Cypress	Monterey cypress (Cupressus macrocarpa)	Pebble Beach, USA	~250	A dramatically situated tree, a western icon, and considered one of the most photographed trees in North America. 36.568748°N 121.965339°W
	Lost Monarch	Coast redwood (Sequoia sempervirens)	Jedediah Smith Redwoods State Park, USA		The world's fifth largest coast redwood in terms of wood volume with a 26 feet (7.9 m) diameter at breast height (with multiple stems included), and 320 feet (98 m) in height.
	Lover's Oak	Southern live oak (Quercus virginiana)	Brunswick, Georgia, USA; 31.14236°N 81.48655°W	900	Noted for its size and age
	Luna	Coast redwood (Sequoia sempervirens)	Humboldt County, USA; 40.2618°N 124.3100°W	600–1000	A 200 feet (61 m) tall redwood that became notable when environmental activist Julia Butterfly Hill lived on a platform in the tree for 738 days in 1997–1999 to prevent it from being logged. In 2000, it was cut halfway through with a chainsaw but has survived and has been braced for support.
	Brooklyn Magnolia	Southern magnolia (Magnolia grandiflora)	Brooklyn, USA	~130	An unusually large magnolia grandiflora for the latitude. A New York City designated landmark. The tree was brought as a seedling from North Carolina and planted around 1885.
	Methuselah	Great Basin bristlecone pine (Pinus longaeva)	Ancient Bristlecone Pine Forest, Inyo County, USA	~4,850	A candidate for the oldest known living organism (approximately 4,850 years).
	Moon trees	Various			Grown from seeds taken into orbit around the Moon.
	Oak of the Golden Dream	Live oak	Santa Clarita, USA	~180	Location of California's first authenticated gold discovery on 9 March 1842
	Old Redwood Highway Palm Trees		Windsor, USA; 38.54374°N 122.80127°W		17 palm trees designated as Windsor historical landmarks.
	Oldest palm tree in Los Angeles	Californian fan palm (Washingtonia filifera)	Los Angeles, USA; 34°0′50″N 118°16′59″W	~150	Transplanted multiple times throughout its lifespan; moved to current location on Exposition Park Drive on 5 September 1914.
	El Palo Alto	Coast redwood (Sequoia sempervirens)	Palo Alto, USA		A landmark that gave the city of Palo Alto its name. It stood up above its surroundings in a wide flat area and thus could be seen from far away in all directions, as far back as 1769 when Spanish explorers camped underneath it. It is no longer as impressive as it once was, having lost more than 50 feet (15 m) since its height was measured at 162.2 feet (49.4 m) in 1814. Since 1975, the unofficial mascot of Stanford University.
	Pando	Quaking aspen (Populus tremuloides)	Fishlake National Forest	<14,000	A quaking aspen colony in Utah, is one of the oldest known clonal colonies at an estimated maximum of 14,000 years, and the heaviest at 6,000 tonnes.
	Pechanga Great Oak	Coast live oak (Quercus agrifolia)	Temecula, USA	1500–2000	Oldest oak tree in the United States, possibly in the world.
	Perryville Tree engravings	Various	Perryville, USA		Trees carved by mentally ill veterans.
	Peter Lebeck Oak	Valley oak (Quercus lobata)	Fort Tejon, USA	185+	An oak in which a grave marker was carved for an early Californian trapper, Peter Lebeck, killed by a grizzly bear in 1837 and buried underneath the tree.
	Pinchot Sycamore	American sycamore (Platanus occidentalis)	Simsbury, USA	300–400+	The largest tree in Connecticut, an ancient sycamore named for Gifford Pinchot. This tree's measurements are: circumference 28 feet (8.5 m); height 100 feet (30 m); average spread 141 feet (43 m).
	Queens Giant	Tulip-tree (Liriodendron tulipifera)	Northeast Queens, USA	350–450	The tree measures 40 metres (130 ft) tall and is 350–450 years old. It is the oldest living organism in the New York metropolitan area.
	Sacred Oak	Chinkapin oak (Quercus muehlenbergii)	Oley Valley, USA	500	Claimed to be more than 500 years old, this oak tree earned its name through Native American legend. Its measurements are: circumference 21 feet (6.4 m); height 73 feet (22 m); average spread 118 feet (36 m).
	Santa Barbara's Moreton Bay Fig Tree		Santa Barbara, USA	149	Believed to be the largest Ficus macrophylla in the United States. An Australian seaman gifted the seed to a local girl in 1876. The tree was officially designated as a historic landmark in 1970.
	Seven Sisters Oak	Southern live oak (Quercus virginiana)	Mandeville, USA	1,500	Believed to be nearly 1,500 years old. The tree has a girth of over 38 feet (12 m) and is the president of the Live Oak Society.
	Stratosphere Giant	Coast redwood (Sequoia sempervirens)	Humboldt Redwoods State Park, USA		112.8 m tall, the tallest known tree in the world until displaced by Hyperion.
	Survivor Tree	American elm (Ulmus americana)	Oklahoma City, USA		Incorporated into the Oklahoma City National Memorial. Located across the street from the former Alfred P. Murrah Federal Building, it survived the terrorist bombing in Oklahoma City on 19 April 1995.
	Survivor Tree	Callery pear (Pyrus calleryana)	Manhattan, USA		Survived the September 11 attacks on the World Trade Center in 2001 and was incorporated into the National September 11 Memorial & Museum.
	Treaty Oak	Southern live oak (Quercus virginiana)	Jacksonville, USA		An octopus-like southern live oak (Quercus virginiana) in Jacksonville, Florida. It is estimated to be 250 years old and is located in Treaty Oak Park in the Southbank area of Downtown Jacksonville.
	Treaty Oak	Plateau live oak (Quercus fusiformis)	Austin, USA	500	A 500-year old plateau live oak (Quercus fusiformis) in Austin, Texas. It is the last surviving member of the Council Oaks, a grove of 14 trees that served as a sacred meeting place for Comanche and Tonkawa tribes prior to European settlement of the area.
	Treaty Tree	Douglas fir (Pseudotsuga menziesii)	Nisqually Reservation, USA		Marks the location of the Treaty of Medicine Creek between the United States and most Pacific Northwest Native American tribes.
	Tree of Life	Southern live oak (Quercus virginiana)	New Orleans, USA	~285	Popular landmark at Audubon Park
	Tree of Life	Sitka spruce (Picea sitchensis)	Kalaloch, USA		Spans a gap carved by a stream at the edge of a bluff near Olympic National Park.
	The Tree That Owns Itself (Georgia)	White oak (Quercus alba)	Athens, USA	79	According to local folklore, it owns itself and all land within 2.5 m (8.2 ft) of its base.
	The Tree That Owns Itself (Alabama)	Post oak (Quercus stellata)	Eufaula, USA		Legally given ownership of itself and its land in 1936 by the mayor of Eufaula.
	UConn West Hartford Oak	White oak (Quercus alba)	West Hartford, USA	250–300	Connecticut co-champion white oak tree. Measurements as of 2020: circumference 24 ft 9 in (7.54 m); height 78 ft (24 m); spread 115 ft (35 m).
	Washington Oak	White oak	Princeton, USA		Overlooks the Princeton Battlefield State Park; located where British and American forces first saw each other, igniting the Battle of Princeton in 1777.
	Washington tree	Giant sequoia (Sequoiadendron giganteum)	Sequoia National Park, USA		
	Witch Tree	Northern white cedar (Thuja occidentalis)	Grand Portage, USA	~300	Also called Manido Giizhigance, or Little Cedar Spirit Tree by the Ojibwe Native American tribe, is a cedar growing on the rocky shoreline of Lake Superior. It is at least 300 years old, possibly twice that, revered by the local Ojibwe tribe, and mentioned by French explorers in 1731.
	World's Largest Rosebush	Rosa banksiae	Tombstone, USA	141	Guinness record "largest rosebush" of 8,000 sq ft (740 m^{2}) area, with a 12 ft (3.7 m) circumference trunk.

=== Historical ===
Image	Name	Species	Location	Age (years)	Notes
	Hollow Log (Balch Park)	Giant sequoia (Sequoiadendron giganteum)	Balch Park, Tulare County, California US; 36.220404°N 118.679318°W		A naturally hollowed out log of a now fallen giant sequoia that was once an attraction at a private resort before the land was donated as a park in 1930.
	Beaman Oak	White oak	Lancaster, Massachusetts, US		The largest white oak in Massachusetts, with a 31-foot circumference and featured on the seal of the Town of West Boylston.
	Balmville Tree	Eastern cottonwood (Populus deltoides)	Balmville, New York, US		Oldest tree of its species in the Eastern United States, placed on the National Register of Historic Places in 2000 as New York State's smallest state forest.
	Bicentennial Oak	Bur oak (Quercus macrocarpa)	Vanderbilt University, USA	250–300	One of the largest trees on the Vanderbilt campus, and the only one known to predate the university and the Revolutionary War. Died and fell in 2022.
	Black Hawk Tree	Cottonwood (Populus sect. Aigeiros)	Prairie du Chien, Wisconsin, US		Debunked local lore held that Sauk Chief Black Hawk once hid amongst its branches to escape his pursuers. The tree was destroyed by a storm during the 1920s.
	Burmis tree	Limber pine (Pinus flexilis)	Crowsnest Pass, Alberta, Canada		Declared dead in 1979 but still standing on the north side of the Crowsnest Highway.
	Buttonwood Agreement Tree	Buttonwood (Platanus occidentalis)	Wall Street, New York, New York, US		The tree which once stood at the foot of Wall Street in New York City. It was under this tree that stock traders once gathered and formed the Buttonwood Agreement, which later evolved into the New York Stock Exchange.
	Charter Oak	White oak	Connecticut, US 41.75930°N 72.67355°W		An unusually large tree that was used to hide the Connecticut colonial constitution from English governor-general Sir Edmund Andros. The oak became a symbol of American independence and is commemorated on the Connecticut State Quarter. It fell during a storm in 1856.
	Clement Oak	White oak	Deptford Township, New Jersey, US 39°50′41″N 75°5′25″W	approx. 500	Local landmark for aboriginal Lenape and early settlers. Landing site for the first aerial flight in North America in 1793. Destroyed in a storm in 2022.
	Discovery Tree	Sequoiadendron giganteum	Calaveras Grove, California; 38.27751667°N 120.30833333°E		The Discovery Tree was the first giant sequoia felled for exhibition. Displayed in San Francisco and New York City, it was destroyed by fire while en route to Paris. The tree was the first giant sequoia to be felled by a basal cut, allowing botanists to accurately determine its age by counting its rings.
	Door Tree	Quercus alba	Hamden, Connecticut; 41.412°N 77.895°E	200	A white oak tree which grew to resemble a doorway opening. The tree was vandalized in 2019.
	Eagle Tree	California sycamore (Platanus racemosa)	Compton, California, US	285–350	Was the natural boundary marker for Rancho San Pedro. Fell in 2022 after disease, vandalism, and government neglect.
	Eisenhower Tree	Loblolly pine (Pinus taeda)	Augusta, Georgia, US	100–125	Loblolly pine tree on the Augusta National Golf Club course, said to be "among the most famous landmarks in golf", and particularly frustrating to Dwight D. Eisenhower. Removed in 2014 after suffering irreparable damage during an ice storm.
	Encino Oak Tree	Coast live oak (Quercus agrifolia)	Los Angeles, California, US	1,000	A 1,000-year-old tree in the Encino district of Los Angeles. It was also known as the Lang Oak. Once described as "the oldest known tree in the city of Los Angeles", it fell on 7 February 1998, due to strong winds from an El Niño storm.
	Forest King	Sequoiadendron giganteum	Nelder Grove, US		The Forest King, a giant sequoia exhibition tree, toured the United States after it was felled in Nelder Grove. In 1870, P.T. Barnum bought the tree for his New York attractions.
	General Noble Tree		Converse Basin Grove, US		In 1892, the General Noble Tree, once the largest giant sequoia ever cut down, was felled for display at the 1893 World’s Columbian Exposition in Chicago.
	Geneseo Big Tree		Geneseo, New York, US		A giant tree on the Genesee River, reported by some as an elm, by others as an oak. It was the site of the 1797 Treaty of Big Tree between Robert Morris and the Seneca tribe to sell most of western New York, also known as The Holland Purchase. It was washed away in a flood in the mid-19th century.
	Great Elm	Elm	Boston, Massachusetts, US		The tree stood at the center of the Boston Common until 15 February 1876. Initially believed to be used for executions, the tree later gained prestige as a centerpiece of the area.
	Herbie	American elm (Ulmus americana)	Yarmouth, Maine, US	212	At 110 feet in height, it was the oldest and largest of its kind in New England. Having battled Dutch elm disease for years, its condition worsened and it was felled in 2010.
	The Hippie Tree	Willow	Traverse City, Michigan, US		A huge sprawling willow on the grounds of the former Traverse City State Hospital, this tree has been a landmark to locals due to it being covered in paint for many years. Due to being on old hospital grounds, this tree has been considered haunted by spirits, escaped patients fleeing the hospital, as well as Odawa people.
	Hooker Oak	Valley oak (Quercus lobata)	Chico, California, US		At its discovery in 1872 by Joseph Hooker, it was believed to be the largest of its species in the world and possibly as old as 1,000 years. After it fell in 1977, it was discovered it was actually two 325-year-old oak trees that had long since grown into one.
	Inspiration Oak	Live oak	Magnolia Springs, Alabama, US	90	Having a spread of 192 feet, this oak, a landmark on US Highway 98, was girdled with a chainsaw in October 1990 during an eminent domain dispute with Baldwin County officials. Grafting efforts to save the tree failed, and it died in 1993. Estimated by locals to be around 500 years old, it was discovered to be only 90 years old in a ring count.
	"The Joshua Tree"	Yucca palm (Yucca brevifolia)	Mojave Desert, US		A lone-standing Joshua tree featured in the album art of The Joshua Tree by U2. The tree fell around 2000. A plaque now stands where the tree was, as the site is a popular site for fans to pay tribute to the band.
	Kiidk'yaas (The Golden Spruce)	Sitka spruce (Picea sitchensis)	Haida Gwaii, British Columbia, Canada		A rare golden Sitka spruce sacred to the Haida, on Haida Gwaii. The tree was illegally felled in 1997.
	Liberty Tree	Elm tree	Boston, Massachusetts, US		A famous tree near Boston Common where colonists in Boston staged the first act of defiance against the British government at the tree. The tree became a rallying point for the growing resistance to the rule of Britain over the American colonies and for that reason it was felled by British soldiers in 1775.
	Lincoln Oak	Oak	Bloomington, Illinois, US		Historic tree at which Stephen A. Douglas and Abraham Lincoln both gave speeches during the 1850s. The tree died in 1976.
	Logan Elm	American elm (Ulmus americana)	Pickaway County, Ohio, US		One of the largest American elm trees recorded at 65-foot-tall (20 m) with a trunk circumference of 24 feet (7.3 m) and a crown spread of 180 feet (55 m). Weakened by Dutch elm disease, the tree died from storm damage in 1964.
	Mark Twain Tree	Sequoiadendron giganteum	Converse Basin Grove, US		The Mark Twain Tree was cut down as an exhibition tree and displayed at the American Museum of Natural History in New York City and the Natural History Museum in London. Its remains, known as the Mark Twain Stump, are preserved in Kings Canyon National Park.
	Mercer Oak	White oak	Princeton, New Jersey, US		The tree on which a wounded General Hugh Mercer rested during the American Revolutionary War's Battle of Princeton. Despite its fall in early 2000, it continues to be Princeton's emblem.
	Mingo Oak	White oak	Mingo County, West Virginia, US		Formerly the oldest and largest white oak in the United States until its felling on 23 September 1938.
	Mother of the Forest	Giant sequoia (Sequoiadendron giganteum)			In 1854, workers stripped 60 tons of bark from the tree to display at exhibitions in New York and London. The bark was shipped around Cape Horn to the New York Crystal Palace, where the bark shell was reassembled and first showcased. Later, it was transported to London and featured in The Crystal Palace under the title "The Mammoth Tree from California." Without its protective bark, the tree died soon after, and what remained was destroyed in a 1908 fire.
	National Christmas Tree	Blue spruce (Picea pungens)	President's Park in Washington, D.C., US		It was 9 meters (30 feet) tall when it was transplanted from York, Pennsylvania, in 1978. It was felled by a windstorm on 19 February 2011.
	Nooksack Giant	Douglas fir (Pseudotsuga menziesii)	Maple Falls, Washington, US	480	Tallest tree reliably (though disputed by modern researchers) recorded, at 465 feet (142 m). Felled for lumber in early 1896, an act The New York Times described as a "truly pitiable tale" and a "crime".
The Old Man of the Lake in Oregon, United States	Old Man of the Lake	Theorized to be a hemlock	Crater Lake, Oregon, USA	450+	A tree trunk that has been bobbing around since at least 1896.
	Old Oak Tree	White oak	Churchyard of Presbyterian Church in Basking Ridge, Basking Ridge, NJ	600	Nearly 100 feet (30 m) tall with a spread of more than 130 feet (40 m) and 20 feet (6.1 m) in circumference. Evangelical speakers woke up more than 3,000 underneath in 1740. Watched over American Revolutionary War events, survived numerous hurricanes, but died in 2016 and was taken down in 2017.
	Pioneer Cabin Tree	Giant sequoia (Sequoiadendron giganteum)	Calaveras Big Trees State Park, California	1000 (est.)	Also known as The Tunnel Tree, it was one of the US's most famous trees drawing thousands of visitors annually. In the 1880s, a tunnel in its trunk was made so that tourists could pass through it. It fell during a rainstorm and flooding on 8 January 2017.
	Prometheus	Great Basin bristlecone pine (Pinus longaeva)		5,000	Was the oldest living non-clonal organism. The age was estimated at 5,000 years. The tree was cut down on 6 August 1964, by a graduate student and US Forest Service personnel for research purposes, though at the time they did not know of its world-record age.
	Senator	Bald cypress (Taxodium distichum)	Big Tree Park, Longwood, Florida, US	~3,500	Was the oldest bald cypress tree in the world. It was 35 meters (115 feet) tall with a trunk diameter of 344 cm and an estimated stem volume of 119.4 m^{3}. It was estimated to be 3,500 years old at the time of its demise in early 2012.
	Treaty of Greenville Tree		Greenville, Ohio, US		
	Treaty Elm	Elm (Ulmus)	Penn Treaty Park, Philadelphia, Pennsylvania, US 39.966°N 75.129°W		This elm was the site of the Treaty of Shackamaxon between William Penn and Tamanend of the Lenape signed in 1682. The large tree was felled in a storm in 1810. The tree symbolizes a period of hope for peaceful coexistence between European settlers and Native Americans. An obelisk (1827) and a park (1893) mark the site of the tree.
	Trout Lake Big Tree	Ponderosa pine (Pinus ponderosa)	Mount Adams (Washington), US 46.0588°N 121.5296°W		At 202 feet (62 m) tall and a diameter of 7 feet (210 cm), it is one of the largest known ponderosa pine trees in the world.
	Vizcaíno-Serra Oak	California live oak (Quercus agrifolia)	Monterey, California		The tree was closely associated with the early history of Monterey, California and Junípero Serra. First described in 1602 by Sebastián Vizcaíno, it stood next to a creek in what is now Monterey State Historic Park. It was declared dead in 1904.
	The Washington Oak		Hampton Plantation near Charleston, South Carolina, US		When George Washington visited Charleston in 1791, Eliza Lucas Pinckney complained about a live oak that blocked the view. Washington remarked that he liked the tree, so it was saved and has since been known as the Washington Oak.
	Wawona Tree	Giant sequoia (Sequoiadendron giganteum)	Mariposa Grove in Yosemite National Park, Mariposa County, California, US		Giant sequoia with a tunnel cut through it. Fell in 1969.
	Salem Oak	White oak (Quercus alba)	Salem Friends Burial Grounds in Salem, New Jersey, US	500–600	22 ft (6.7 m) circumference. Was estimated between 500 and 600 years old. This tree did not sustain any damage from the Hurricane Sandy in October 2012. Was removed in June 2019 due to complications involving old age.
	Shubie Tree / Stewackie Tree	Northern red oak (Quercus rubra)	Along Nova Scotia Highway 102 in Shubenacadie, Nova Scotia, Canada	approx. 300	A lone red oak standing in a farm field, iconic in Nova Scotia for its size, photogenic appearance, and proximity to Nova Scotia Highway 102. Felled by Hurricane Fiona in 2022.
	Webster Sycamore	American sycamore (Platanus occidentalis)	Near Webster Springs in Webster County, West Virginia, US	approx. 500	The largest American sycamore in the US state of West Virginia until its felling in 2010.
	Wye Oak	White oak	Maryland, US		Was the honorary state tree of Maryland, and the largest white oak tree in the United States until a lightning strike.
	Henry Clay Oak	White oak	Raleigh, North Carolina, US	approx. 200	Associated with William Polk, Alexander B. Andrews, and especially Henry Clay

=== Petrified ===
Image	Name	Species	Location	Age (years)	Notes
	Callixylon tree	Archaeopteris	Ada, Oklahoma, US	250,000,000	Discovered on a farm, it was the largest example of a petrified tree when it was discovered in 1913. It is estimated to be about 250,000,000 years old. After a 23-year dispute with the Smithsonian Institution in Washington D.C., the tree's fragments were displayed on the East Central Oklahoma State University in March 1936.
	Ginkgo Petrified Forest	Various	Washington, US		
	Petrified Forest	Various	Sonoma County, California, US		On the List of California Historical Landmarks.
	Petrified Forest National Park	Various	Arizona, US		
	Mississippi Petrified Forest	Various	Near Flora, Mississippi, US	36 million years old	This forest is believed to have been formed 36 million years ago when fir and maple logs washed down an ancient river channel to the current site where they later became petrified.

=== Christmas trees ===
- Anthem Christmas tree, the tallest Christmas tree in the United States, erected annually at the Outlets at Anthem outside Phoenix, Arizona.
- Boston Christmas Tree. Since 1971, given to Boston by the people of Nova Scotia in thanks for their assistance following the 1917 Halifax Explosion. Located in the Boston Common.
- Capitol Christmas Tree, the tree erected annually on the West Front Lawn of the United States Capitol, in Washington, D.C.
- Chicago Christmas Tree, the annual tree located in Millennium Park in the city of Chicago. Historically, the tree was located in Grant Park and Daley Plaza.
- Grove Christmas Tree, a 100-foot tree that is lit every year at The Grove at Farmer's Market in Los Angeles, California.
- Rockefeller Center Christmas Tree, a Christmas tree on display every December in Rockefeller Center, New York City.

== South America ==
=== Living ===
Image	Name	Species	Location	Age (years)	Notes
	Cashew of Pirangi	Cashew (Anacardium occidentale)	5.978657°S 35.123372°W		Major tourist attraction in Natal, Brazil. Believed to be the biggest cashew in the world.
	Cashew of A Praia	Cashew (Anacardium occidentale)	Cajueiro da Praia		
	Gran Abuelo	Fitzroya cupressoides	Alerce Costero National Park, Chile	c. 3600	While it has been on the list of oldest trees, this Alerce tree (Fitzroya cupressoides) is now rivalling others to be possibly the oldest tree in the world.

=== Historical ===
Image	Name	Species	Location	Age (years)	Notes
	Arbol de Guacari	Samanea saman	Guacarí, Colombia		Famous tree engraved in the $500 coin

=== Petrified ===
Image	Name	Species	Location	Age (years)	Notes
	Bosques Petrificados de Jaramillo National Park	Various	Deseado Department, Argentina	150 million years	The vegetation in the park is mostly low spiny shrubs adapted for living in arid environments.
	Palaeobotanical Garden in Mata	Various	Mata, Brazil	200 million years	Fossil natural reserve with an area of 36,000 m^{2}.
	Petrified Forest Florentino Ameghino	Lauraceae and Fagaceae forest.	Between Gaiman and Mártires Department	60 million years	The reserve occupies some 220,000 hectares of which 223 are used for research and only 23 are open to the general public.
	Pichasca Natural Monument	Various	Río Hurtado, Chile	70 million years	
	Puyango Petrified Forest	Various	Puyango River, Ecuador	60 million - 500 million years	The main attraction of the Petrified Forest of Puyango are the petrified trees of the Araucarioxylon genus.
	Sarmiento Petrified Forest	Primitive conifers and palm trees	Sarmiento, Chubut, Argentina	65 million years	This petrified forest is a provincial natural monument from the Cenozoic era.
	Teresina Fossil Forest	Various	Teresina, Brazil	270 million – 280 million	Petrified forest from the Permian period located on the banks of the Poti River, in the urban area of Teresina (Piauí, Brazil).

== Oceania ==
=== Living ===
Image	Name	Species	Location	Age (years)	Notes
	Lahaina Banyan Tree	Banyan (Ficus benghalensis)	Lahaina, Hawaii; 20.886111°N 156.674722°W	153	Planted in the 1860s, it covers an entire city block in the waterfront in Lahaina. Severely damaged in the 2023 Hawaii wildfires.
	Cazneaux Tree	River red gum (Eucalyptus camaldulensis)	Near Wilpena Pound, South Australia; 31°31′13″S 138°38′14″E		Made famous by photographer Harold Cazneaux in 1937.
	Dave Evans Bicentennial Tree	Karri (Eucalyptus diversicolor)	Near Pemberton, Western Australia; 34°29′35″S 115°58′22″E		Forest fire lookout tree with accessible platform.
	Diamond Tree	Karri (Eucalyptus diversicolor)	10 km from Manjimup, Western Australia		Forest fire lookout tree with accessible wooden platform (52 m high).
	Dig tree		Cooper Creek, Queensland, Australia		Used as a marker by members of the ill-fated Burke and Wills expedition.
	Lone Gum	Coolabah (Eucalyptus coolabah)	Simpson Desert, South Australia, Australia		A solitary coolabah, far from the nearest watercourse, normally grows in heavy clay soils. There is no other tree of its kind in the region and how it came to be there remains a mystery.
	Gloucester Tree	Karri (Eucalyptus diversicolor)	Gloucester National Park Pemberton, Western Australia		Western Australia's most famous karri tree, with accessible aluminium platform, at 61 m (200 ft) high.
	Most remote tree in the world	Sitka spruce (Picea sitchensis)	Campbell Island, New Zealand; 52°32′24″S 169°8′42″E	~115	Recognised by the Guinness World Records as the "most remote tree in the world".
	Old Boab Tree	Boab tree (Adansonia gregorii)	Darwin City, Northern Territory		National Trust of Australia
	Old Jarrah Tree	Jarrah (Eucalyptus marginata)	Perth, Western Australia		
	King Jarrah	Jarrah (Eucalyptus marginata)	Manjimup, Western Australia		Giant jarrah saved by the National Trust upon overhearing two foresters bragging at the pub about a mighty tree they were going to chop down the next morning.
	Curtain Fig Tree	Strangler fig	East Barron near Yungaburra, Tablelands Region, Queensland, Australia		One of the largest trees in North Queensland. The roots dangle 15 metres to the ground to create a curtain-like effect.
	Cathedral Fig Tree	Strangler fig	Danbulla, Tablelands Region, Queensland, Australia	500	"A gigantic 500 year old strangler tree", like the Curtain Fig Tree. Another massive Ficus virens in the Danbulla Forest (17.17772°S 145.65910°E)
	Tane Mahuta ('Lord of the Forest')	Kauri (Agathis australis)	Northland Region, New Zealand	1,250–2,500	It is estimated to be between 1,250 and 2,500 years old.
	Te Matua Ngahere ('Father of the Forest')	Kauri	Northland Region, New Zealand.		
	Bland Oak	Southern live oak (Quercus virginiana)	Sydney, Australia	184	Planted in 1842 by William Bland, it is one of the largest and oldest trees in Sydney. Was the largest in Australia until 1940 when a storm struck parts of it.
	Boab Prison Tree, Derby	Boab tree (Adansonia gregorii)	South of Derby, Western Australia		Claimed to be used as a prison for Indigenous Australian prisoners on their way to Derby for sentencing.
	Boab Prison Tree, Wyndham	Boab (Adansonia gregorii)	Wyndham, Western Australia		Claimed to be used as a prison.
	Centurion	Eucalyptus regnans	Tasmania, Australia		At 99.6 metres, it is the tallest known eucalypt and the tallest known angiosperm in the world, second tallest tree species in the world.
	Lathamus Keep	Tasmanian blue gum (Eucalyptus globulus subsp. globulus)	Huon Valley, Tasmania, Australia	~500	At 80 metres, the tallest known Tasmanian blue gum in the world.
	The Grandis	Flooded gum (Eucalyptus grandis)	Near Bulahdelah, New South Wales, Australia	>400	At 76.2 metres tall though some sources claim that its past height was 84 metres tall. The Grandis is widely regarded as the tallest tree in New South Wales, and one of the oldest, being over 400 years old.
	That Wanaka Tree	Crack willow (Salix × fragilis)	South of Lake Wanaka, Otago, New Zealand		Popular destination for tourists to take Instagram photos, also described as "New Zealand's most famous tree"
	Kidman's Tree of Knowledge	Eucalyptus coolibah	Glengyle Station in Bedourie, Queensland, Australia		Associated with Sidney Kidman who once camped under the tree and planned the expansion of his pastoral empire.

=== Historical ===
Image	Name	Species	Location	Age (years)	Notes
	El Grande	Mountain ash (Eucalyptus regnans)	Derwent valley, Australia	~350	A mountain ash once regarded as Australia's largest tree by volume, killed by a forestry burnoff in 2003.
	The Tree of Knowledge	Ghost gum (Corymbia aparrerinja)	Barcaldine, Queensland, Australia	200	A tree under which the Australian Labor Party was traditionally founded. In an act of vandalism, the tree was poisoned and was eventually declared dead in October 2006.
	One Tree Hill pine	Radiata pine (Pinus radiata)	Maungakiekie, New Zealand		A radiata pine which stood alone until 2000 atop Maungakiekie / One Tree Hill, an extinct volcanic cone in Auckland, New Zealand.
	The Old Gum Tree	River red pine (Eucalyptus camaldulensis)	Glenelg North, Australia		A tree where the proclamation of the establishment of Government of the province of South Australia was read in 1836.
	The Explorers tree	Blue Mountains ash (Eucalyptus oreades)	Katoomba, Australia		Marked by the explorers who crossed the Blue Mountains (New South Wales) in 1813.
	Jacaranda of University of Sydney	Jacaranda (Jacaranda mimosifolia)	University of Sydney Quadrangle, Australia	77–85	A famous tree in the main Quadrangle. Planted 1928. Died of old age in 2016, it was replaced by a clone the following year.
	The Separation Tree	River red gum (Eucalyptus camaldulensis)	Royal Botanic Gardens Victoria, Australia		A famous tree that was a Melbourne landmark and is best known as the site where the citizens of the city congregated on 15 November 1850 to celebrate when the news that Victoria was to separate from the colony of New South Wales. Following attacks by vandals it died in 2015.
	Directions Tree	Yellow box (Eucalyptus melliodora)	Victoria (state), Australia	350	A sacred tree in the Birthing Woods, carrying profound cultural importance to the Djab Wurrung people, in Victoria, Australia was bulldozed in 2020 to make way for a highway despite the efforts of many trying to protect it. This event caused significant uproar and was part of a larger legal battle for the protection of the Birthing Woods as being a culturally significant location having been overturned since the 2013 decision.

== Mythological and religious trees ==
- Bodhi Tree, under which Siddhartha Gautama, the spiritual teacher and founder of Buddhism later known as Gautama Buddha, achieved enlightenment (also called Bodhi).
- World Tree
  - Égig érő fa, the "Tree Reaching into the Sky" of Hungarian folk art and a folk tale type
  - Irminsul
  - Jievaras, the World tree in Lithuanian mythology.
  - Yggdrasil, the World Tree in the Old Norse religion.
- Cutting of the elm, a legendary event concerning a tree at Gisors.
- Cypress of Kashmar, planted by Zoroaster and felled by Caliph Al Mutawakkil.
- Hare Krishna Tree - the tree in Tompkins Square Park associated with the founding of the Krishna movement
- Man-eating tree
- Oak of Mamre
- Thor's Oak, a sacred tree to the ancient Germanic tribe of the Chatti.
- Tree of Knowledge of Good and Evil, from Christianity and Judaism.
- Tree of life, from Christianity and Judaism.
- The Lote Tree
- The Zaqqum Tree

== See also ==
- European Tree of the Year
- Tree of the Year (United Kingdom)
- List of superlative trees
- List of oldest trees
- List of long-living organisms
- List of elm trees
- List of largest giant sequoias
- List of named Eucalyptus trees
- List of banyan trees in India
- List of individual trees in Estonia
- List of Great British Trees
  - Great Trees of London
- List of Champion Trees (South Africa)
- Gerichtslinde
- List of hanging trees
- List of tallest trees
- List of tree genera
- Veteran tree
- Bonsai
- Capitol Christmas Tree
- Living Heritage Tree Museum
- National Christmas Tree (United States)
- Vatican Christmas Tree
