= The Shirin and Farhad Tree =

Coordinates: 34.38715°N 47.131133°E

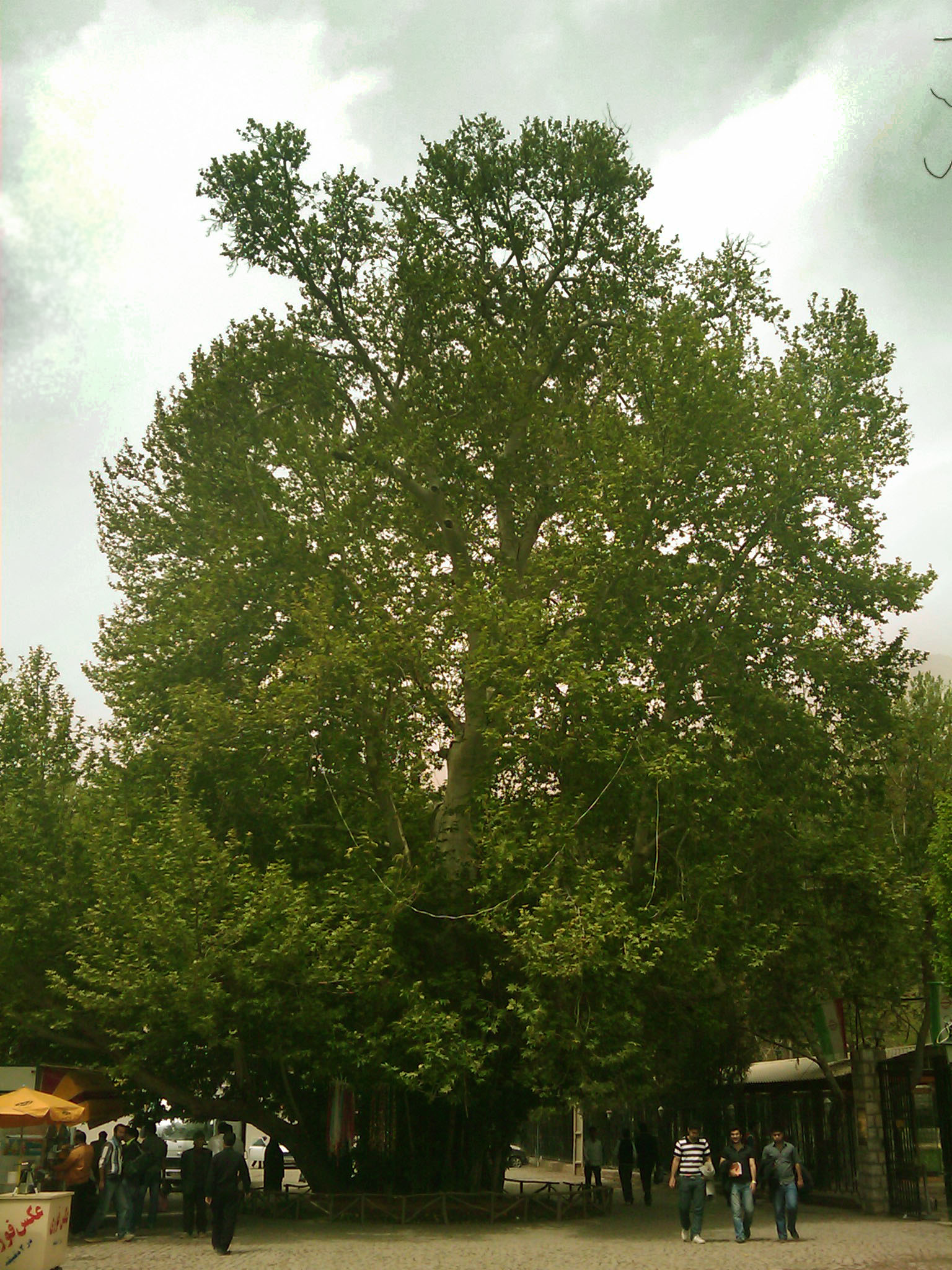
The Shirin and Farhad tree in Taq Bostan

The Shirin and Farhad Tree or Rahmat tree (Kurdish: دار شیرین و فەرهاد, romanized: Dār-e Šīrīn-o Farhād) is a 700-year-old tree of the genus Platanus located in the historical area of Taq Bostan in Kermanshah, Iran. The tree is 37.7 metres (124 ft) tall and 8.46 metres (27.8 ft) wide.

== See also ==
- List of individual trees
