= Bicentennial Oak =

Historic tree (felled 2022)

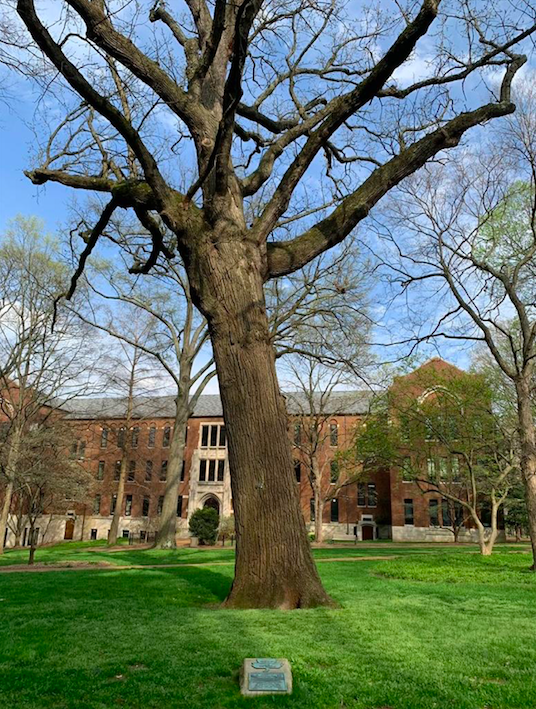
- The tree in 2020
- Species: Quercus macrocarpa
- Location: Vanderbilt University
- Height: ~82 ft
- Diameter: 5 ft
- Date felled: 2022
- Website: https://tufc.com/project/bicentennial-oak-of-vanderbilt/

Bicentennial Oak was a tree located on the Vanderbilt University campus in Nashville, Tennessee, US. The tree was a Bur oak (Quercus macrocarpa), and was planted around 250–300 years ago. The tree was the oldest tree on the entire campus, dating before the university existed, and before the United States declared independence. The tree died in 2022 from old age and was turned into end-grain relief print in honor.

The oak tree originally was planted in the later 1700s.

== See also ==
- List of individual trees
