= Salem Oak =

Oak tree in New Jersey, United States

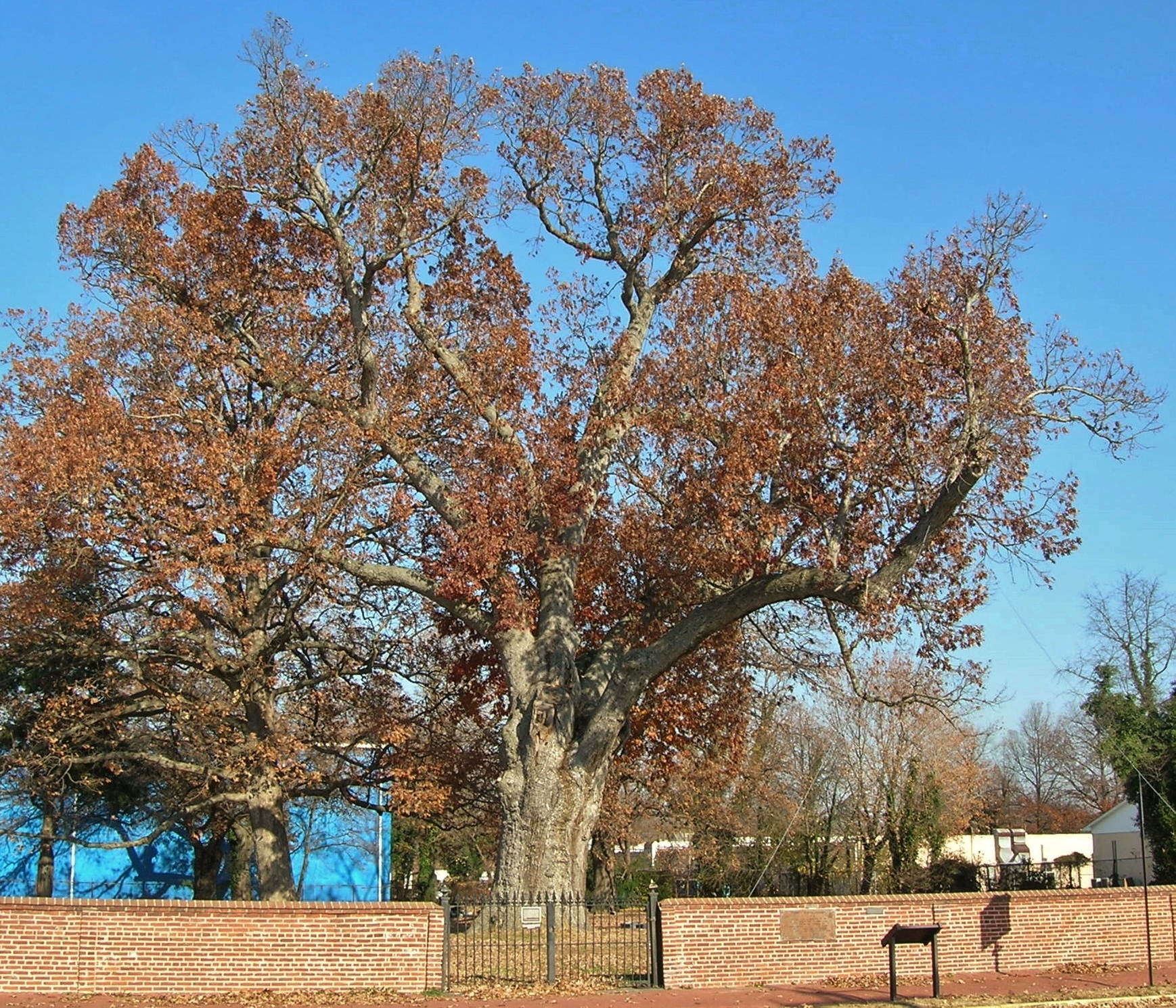
Salem Oak in 2012

The Salem Oak was a white oak tree at the Salem Friends Burial Ground in Salem, in the U.S. state of New Jersey. Estimated to be more than 500 years old, the Salem Oak was a landmark tree under whose branches Salem’s founder John Fenwick is said to have first met with local Lenape tribe of Native Americans in 1675. Fenwick (1618–1683) was the leader of a group of Quakers who emigrated in 1675 from England to Salem, New Jersey, where they established Fenwick's Colony, the first English settlement in West Jersey.

Measuring 22 ft (6.7 m) in circumference and estimated at between 500 and 600 years old, the tree did not sustain any damage from the Hurricane Sandy in October 2012, but collapsed in 2019.

== See also ==
- List of Quaker meeting houses
- List of individual trees
- List of oldest trees
