= Chestnut tree of Melle =

Monumental chestnut tree in Piedmont, Italy

- The monumental chestnut tree of Melle
- Interactive map of Chestnut tree of Melle
- Species: Castanea sativa
- Location: Borgata Pratolungo – Meire Fino, Melle, Piedmont, Italy
- Height: 32 m (105 ft)
- Girth: 9.6 m (31 ft)

The chestnut tree of Melle is a notable monumental tree located in the hamlet of Pratolungo – Meire Fino, in Melle, in the Varaita Valley, Piedmont, northern Italy.

== History ==
The tree is one of the last surviving cultivated sweet chestnut trees in the Varaita Valley, as evidenced by the presence of a graft union, visible as a scar encircling the entire trunk. Local inhabitants refer to it as Tabudiera 'd Titta, where tabudiera is the name of the chestnut variety and Titta is a diminutive of Battista, the name of a former owner whose identity has become part of local legend. Although the chestnut tree is not explicitly mentioned in notarial documents, a deed of division between the brothers Giacomo and Matteo Fino, dated 1 August 1790, refers to land at Pralungo and the chestnut trees growing on it. In all likelihood, these included the monumental specimen, which would already have been in full production at the time. Between 1836 and 1868, the ancestors of the present owners purchased the land at Pralungo, together with the tree. Two other chestnut trees of slightly smaller dimensions once stood in the immediate vicinity of the specimen. Both were felled during World War II to provide firewood. The chestnut tree of Melle is included in the official Italian register of monumental trees under identification number 001/F114/CN/01.

== Description ==
The tree, estimated to be approximately 300 years old, stands at the edge of a field formerly used as a meadow. With a height of 32 metres (105 ft) and a trunk circumference of 9.6 metres (31 ft), it has a harmonious shape, with a crown consisting of four main branches. At the base of the trunk, on the uphill side, there is an enormous cavity affected by wood decay. The cavity is believed to have formed following the detachment of a large basal shoot, probably comparable in size to a second trunk. Some instances of chestnut blight can also be observed in the crown, a condition commonly found in mature trees of this species. Over the years, the tree has undergone several conservation treatments, including the removal of dead branches and the cleaning of decayed wood from the cavity. The affected area was also treated with copper oxychloride compounds in an attempt to counteract the ongoing fungal infection.

== See also ==
- List of individual trees

== Bibliography ==
- IPLA (2008). Alberi monumentali del Piemonte (in Italian). In collaboration with Università degli Studi di Torino. Savigliano: L'Artistica. ISBN 9788873201977.
