= Bialbero di Casorzo =

Cherry tree growing on a mulberry tree in Italy

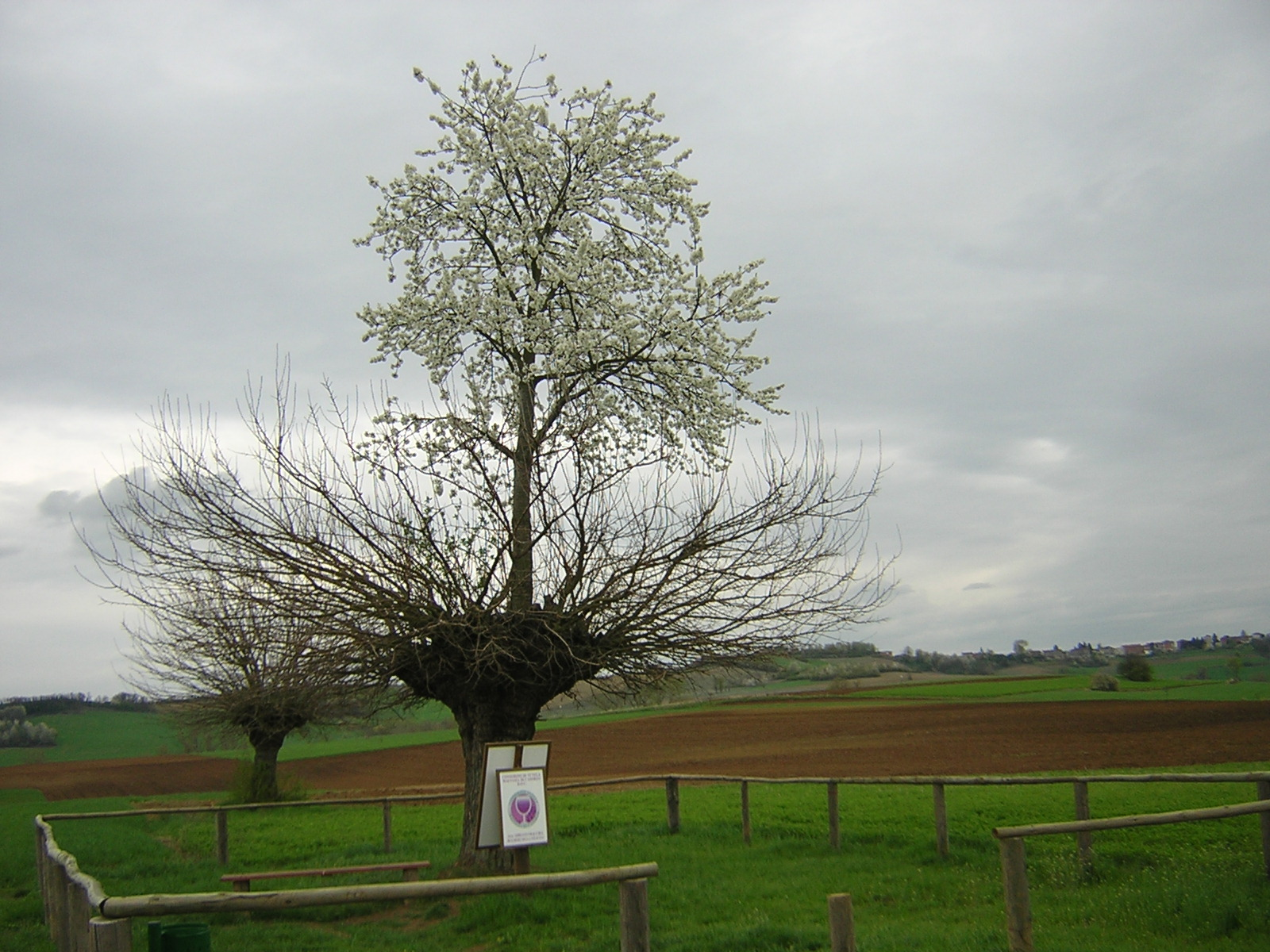
- Bialbero di Casorzo (2005)
- Interactive map of Bialbero di Casorzo
- Species: Mulberry tree and cherry
- Location: Casorzo, Province of Asti, Italy
- Coordinates: 45.00478°N 8.32307°E

The Bialbero di Casorzo (Italian: "double tree of Casorzo") is situated between Grana and Casorzo in Piedmont, Italy. It is a mulberry tree on which a cherry tree grows. The cherry tree rises well above the mulberry tree on which it stands.

Epiphytic growing trees are not unusual, but they normally reach a small size and have a short lifespan, as there is normally not enough humus and space available where they grow.

Large epiphytes like this one require that the "upper tree" have a root connection to the ground, for example by growing down through a hollow trunk.

== See also ==
- List of individual trees
