= Callixylon tree =

Largest known Callixylon tree stump

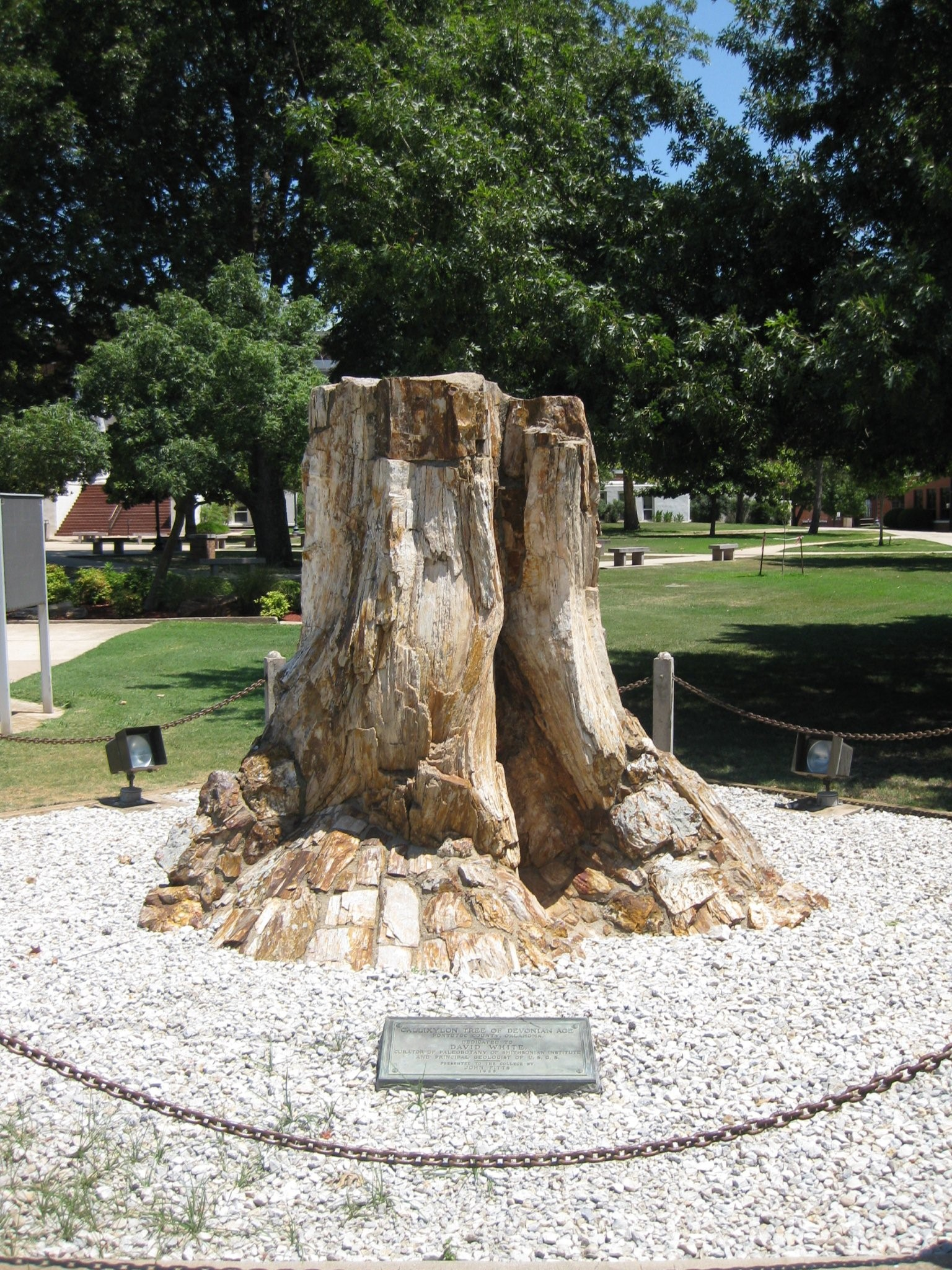
- The Callixylon tree stump located at the entrance to ECU's Campus.
- Species: Callixylon whiteanum
- Location: East Central University, Ada, Oklahoma, US
- Coordinates: 34.46463°N 96.39917°W
- Date seeded: Estimated to be 250,000,000 years ago
- Website: https://www.ecok.edu/community/centennial/time-viewer/callixylon-tree-1936

The Callixylon tree is a 250,000,000 year old petrified tree stump discovered by John Fitts in a field in 1913. This stump is reputed to be the largest stump of Callixylon in the world.

== Discovery ==
The Callixylon tree was discovered by John Fitts in 1913 at a farm near Goose Creek, south of Jesse, Oklahoma, in section 26, T. 1 N., R. 7 E. The fossil was found near the Giant Fitts Oilfield. The petrified stump was the largest of its species to ever be discovered. The Callixylon tree is an example of Callixylon whiteanum, a species of extinct trees found in the late Devonian period. It was later discovered to be a member of the same family as the genus Archaeopteris. It was a series of pieces that were eventually reconstructed to form a full eight foot tall stump.

== Conflict ==
For twenty-three years (1913–1936) the Smithsonian in Washington D.C. and East Central University were vying for possession of the Callixylon tree. David White, head of the U.S. Geological Survey and Curator of Paleobotany at the Smithsonian Institution came from Washington D.C. to examine the fossil and decided it should be displayed at the Smithsonian, not ECU. ECU supporters raised money for erecting the tree fragments into a tree shape and moving it to campus. White died before enough funds had been raised to move the tree to the Smithsonian and as a result the tree was given to East Central University as a gift and memorial. The Callixylon tree was formally accepted by president of ECU at the time, President Linscheid in March, 1936. The plaque at the base of the tree is dedicated to White. The Callixylon tree stump, partially reconstructed, is currently on display at the entrance to East Central University's campus.

== Plaque ==
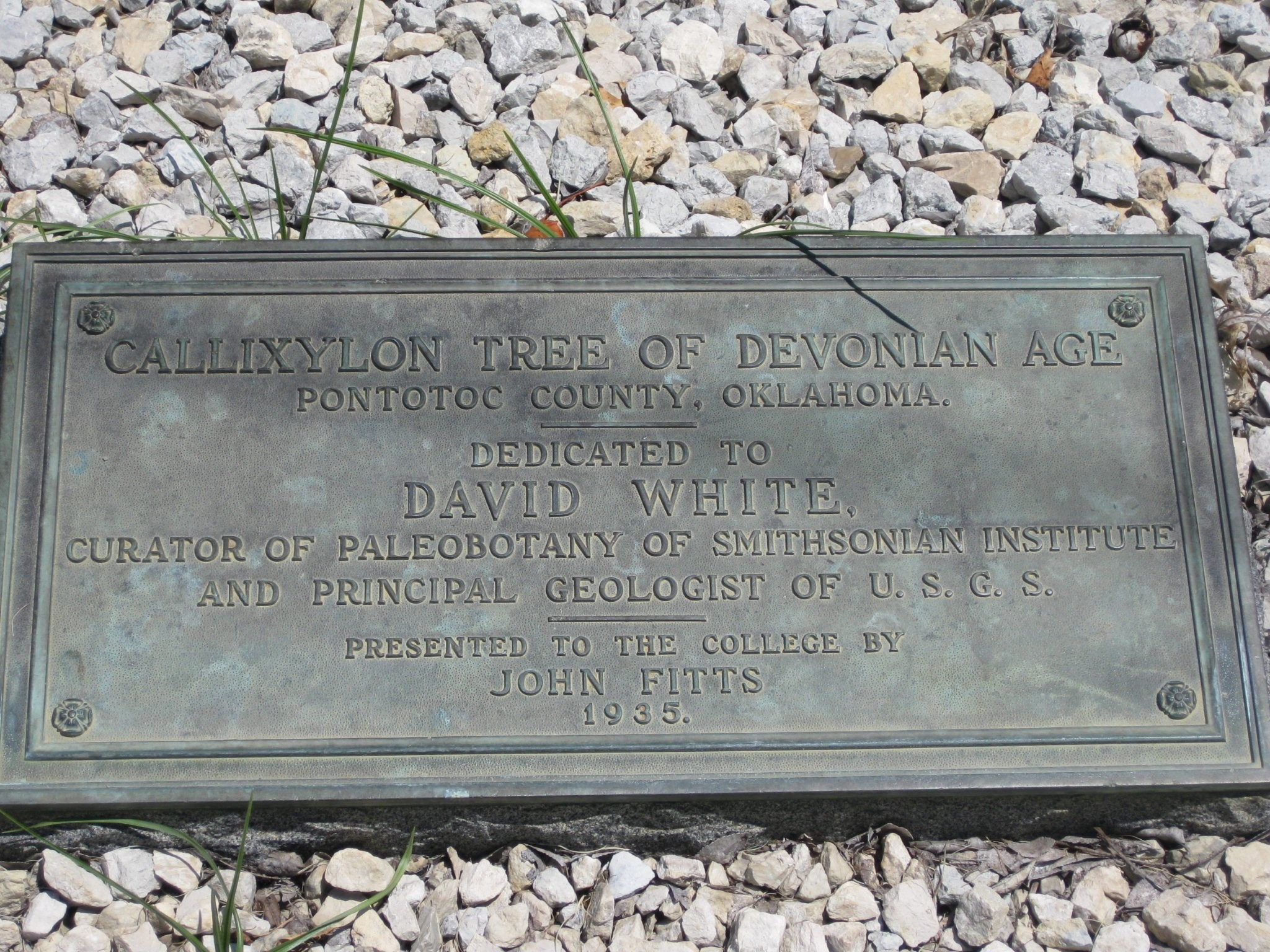

This is the plaque placed at the base of the Callixylon Tree in memorial of David White. It reads as follows:

CALLIXYLON TREE OF DEVONIAN AGE

PONTOTOC COUNTY, OKLAHOMA.

DEDICATED TO

DAVID WHITE

CURATOR OF PALEOBOTANY OF SMITHSONIAN INSTITUTE [sic]

AND PRINCIPAL GEOLOGIST OF U. S. G. S.

PRESENTED TO THE COLLEGE BY

JOHN FITTS

1935.

== See also ==
- List of individual trees
- Ginkgo Petrified Forest
