= Merlin's Oak =

Oak tree in Carmarthen, Wales

Coordinates: 51.8606°N 4.2989°W

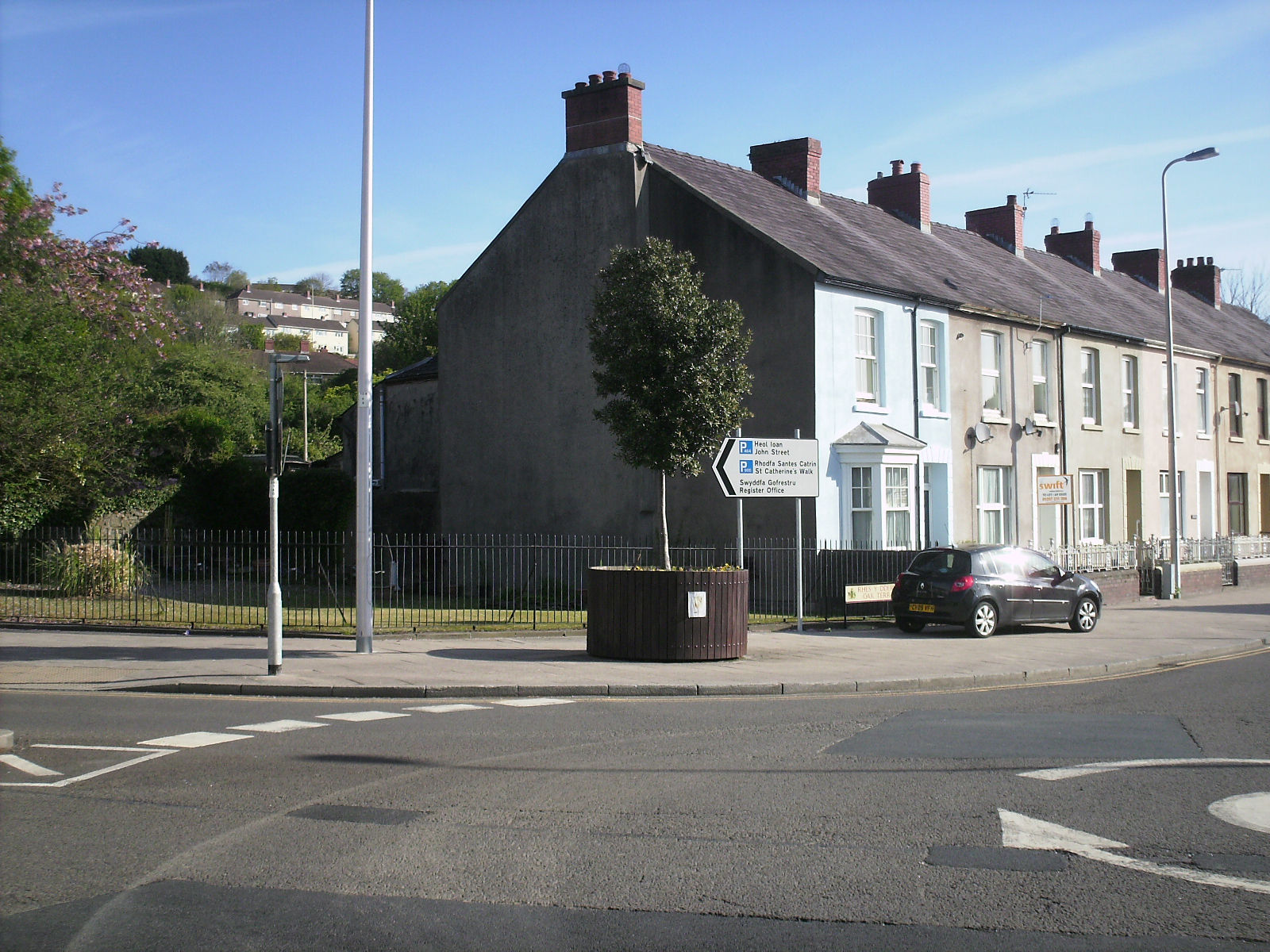
Site of Merlin's Oak with a replacement tree growing in 2011

Merlin's Oak, also known as the Old Oak and Priory Oak, was a pedunculate oak that once stood on the corner of Oak Lane and Priory Street in Carmarthen, South Wales. Merlin's Oak is associated with the legend of Merlin in the local lore, but it is also said to have been planted by a schoolmaster in 1659 or 1660, to celebrate the return of King Charles II of England to the throne. Legend had it that should the oak fall, disaster would befall the town.

== History ==
According to a tradition, Carmarthen is the birthplace of Merlin, the mythical magician. It is said that Merlin made the following prophecy:

When Merlin's tree shall tumble down, Then shall fall Carmarthen town

According to another version of the prophecy, the town of Carmarthen will flood or drown if the oak falls. During the years, generations of town councillors have worked much to maintain this tree, despite the fact that it was inconveniently situated in the traffic, presumably figuring that "it is better to be safe than sorry." The origin of the Oak is not clear, though the tree is reported to have sprung from an acorn planted in 1659 by a master called Adams from the Queen Elizabeth Grammar School, who is thought to be an ancestor of the American President of the same name. Adams planted the acorn to commemorate King Charles II of England's restoration to the throne.

It is also possible that the tree was formerly positioned in the grounds of the medieval Carmarthen Priory. The planting location is just approximately 100 yards (91 meters) north-west of the former gatehouse priory, which may reflect why the tree is sometimes referred to as the Priory Oak. As the previous priory's properties were converted via building construction and new roads around the old tree, it essentially became a tree street in the middle of this crowded market town.

In the early 19th century, a local man appears to have poisoned the tree. It is reported that the poisoning was done by a nearby shopkeeper who objected to the age-old tradition of people gathering under its spreading branches on days and nights and the oak is believed to have died in 1856. Then, as traffic levels rose, the space around the tree was converted into a traffic island. In 1951, a branch was broken off the dead tree; this fragment can still be seen in Carmarthenshire County Museum. In 1978, the last fragment of the tree's stump was removed from its original place, to help the traffic flow at a busy junction.

== Legacy ==
The Old Oak is now displayed in Saint Peter's Civic Hall in Nott Square, Carmarthen. A replacement tree was planted at the same site in 2009.

== See also ==
- List of individual trees
