= Waldtraut (tree) =

Tallest tree in Germany

Coordinates: 47°57′12″N 7°51′40″E

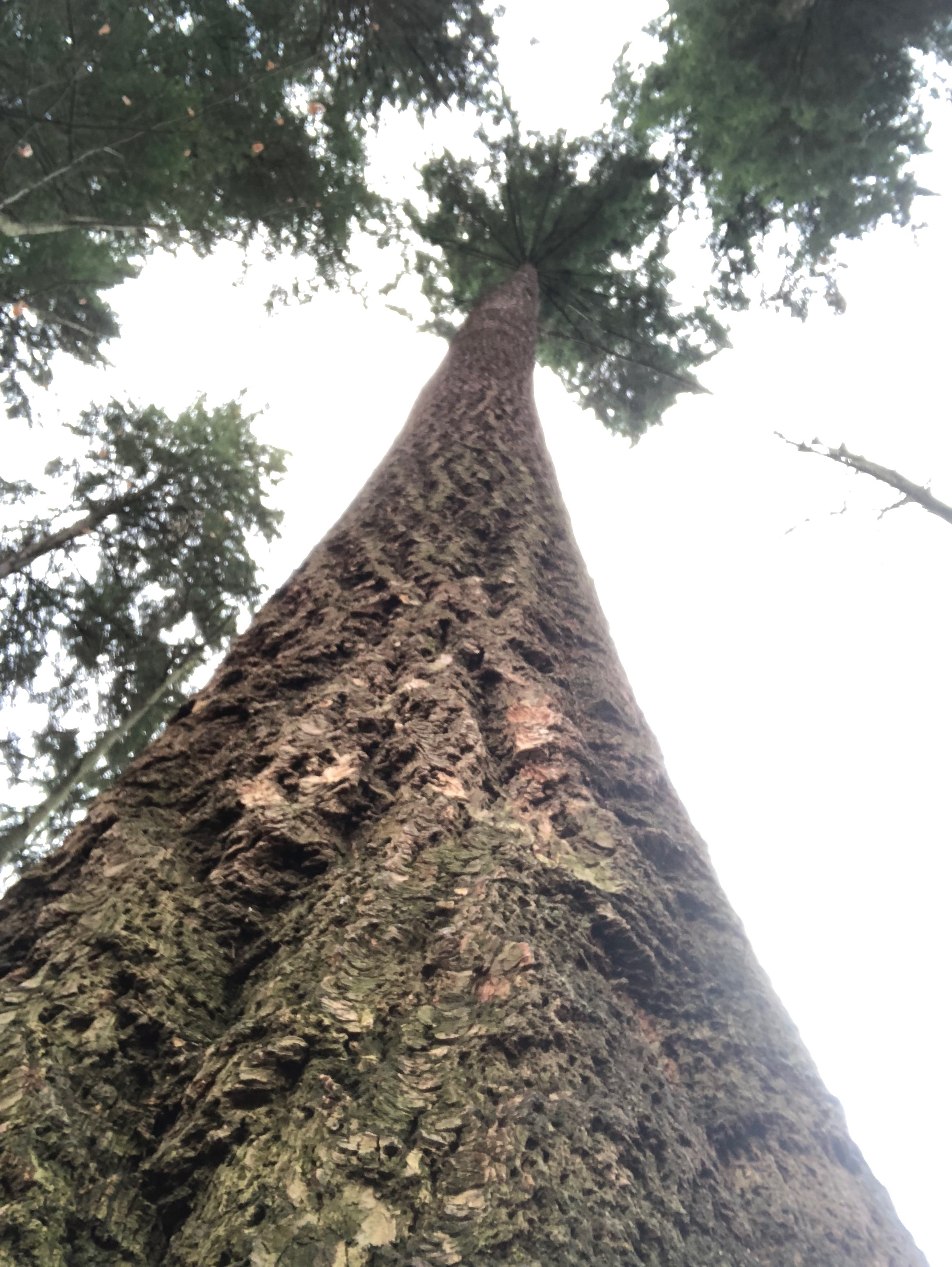
Waldtraut, the tallest tree in Germany, in 2019.

The Waldtraut tree (German: Waldtraut vom Mühlwald) is a Douglas fir that is currently the tallest tree in Germany, standing at approximately 68 meters. Waldtraut stands just south of the present-day Freiburg-Günterstal Arboretum in Freiburg im Breisgau, Baden-Württemberg. It was planted at its current location in 1913 as a three-year-old sapling and is therefore 116 years old. Several other Douglas firs of the same age and almost the same height stand around it.

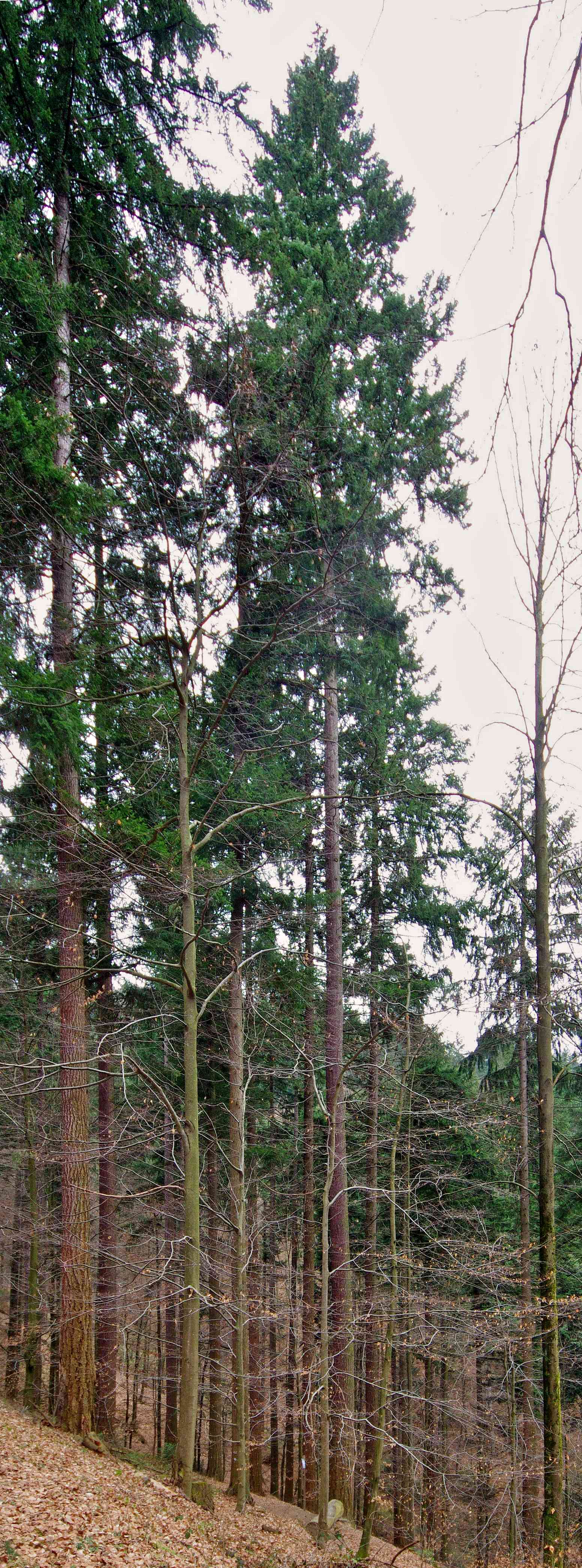
View of Waldtraut next to other Douglas firs.

The Douglas tree grows by about 30 centimeters every year.

== History ==
The first Douglas fir specimens was brought to Europe in the late 18th century by naturalist Archibald Menzies, and the species was first botanically described in 1803. In 1880, the Association of German Forestry Experimental Institutes began an experiment to cultivate the tree in Germany. Douglas firs were first planted in Freiburg in 1896. In Baden, cultivation was temporarily limited to experimental areas such as at the Waldtraut site in the Günterstal forest district.

Waltraut was planted in 1913 as a three-year-old seedling in the Freiburg city forest, the Mühlwald at the foot of the Black Forest mountain Schauinsland.

== Height ==
The tree’s height in 2008 was 63.33 m and its trunk circumference at the base was 300 cm (measured in 2008). It thus relegated a Douglas fir from Eberbach in the Odenwald, which was 61.60 m tall, to second tallest. The height was determined by a surveying team from the Geodetic Institute of the University of Karlsruhe on 18 August 2008. In March 2017, the Forestry Office determined its current height to be 66.581 m. The measurement from 13 April 2024, yielded 67.85 m.

== See also ==
- List of individual trees
