= Perryville Tree engravings =

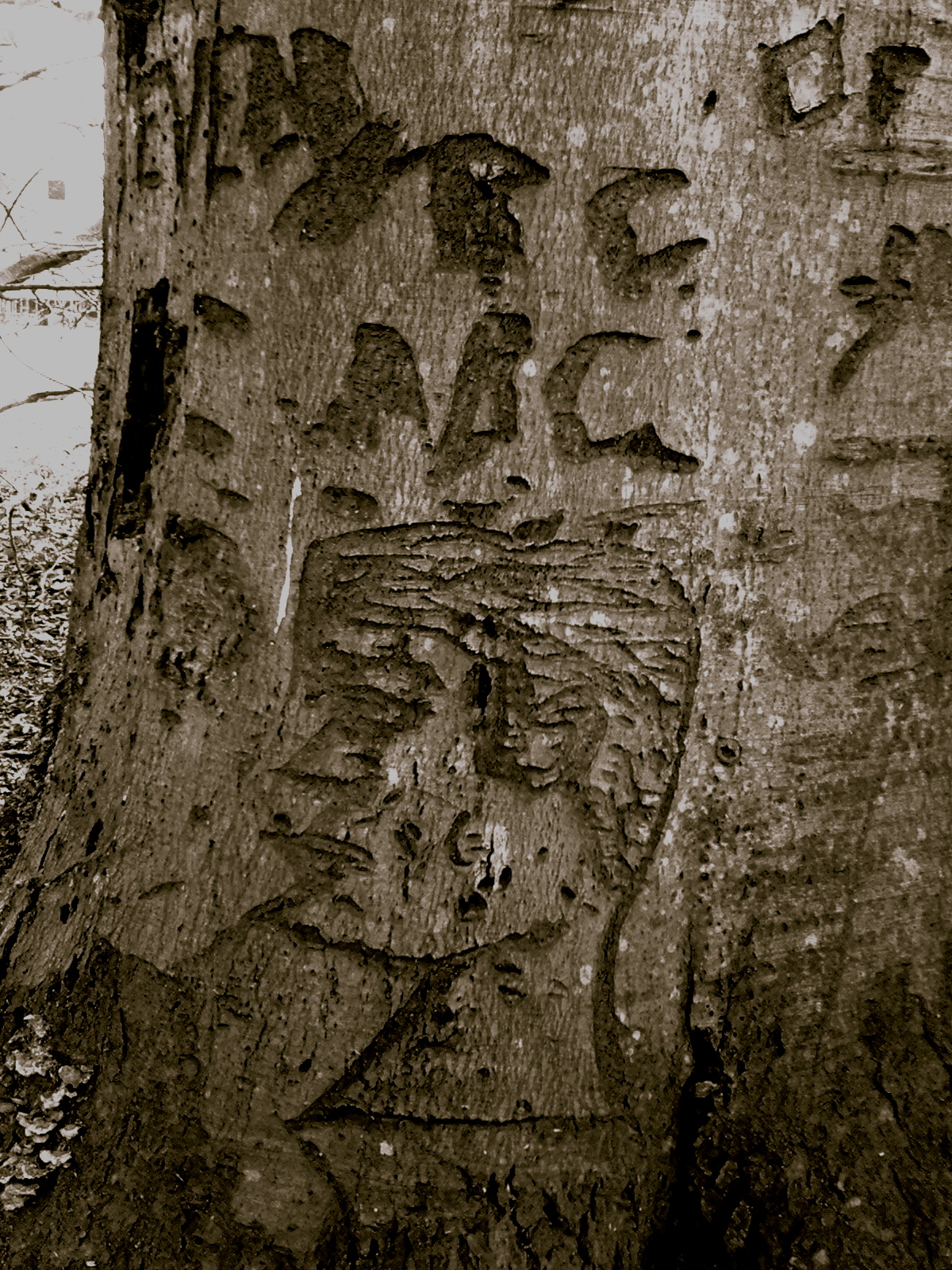
Tree with an engraving of a face

The Perryville Tree Engravings are carvings and engravings on more than 100 trees located in Perryville Community Park in Perryville, Maryland. The trees were carved by former patients of the nearby Perry Point Veteran's Medical Center, which was a psychiatric hospital. The trees sit on land formerly owned by the hospital which is now part of Perryville Community Park.

== Engravings ==
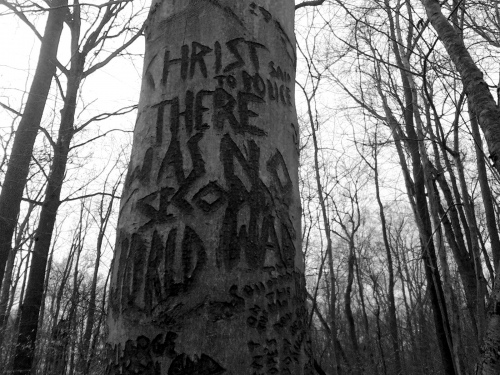
"Christ said to police there was no Second World War"

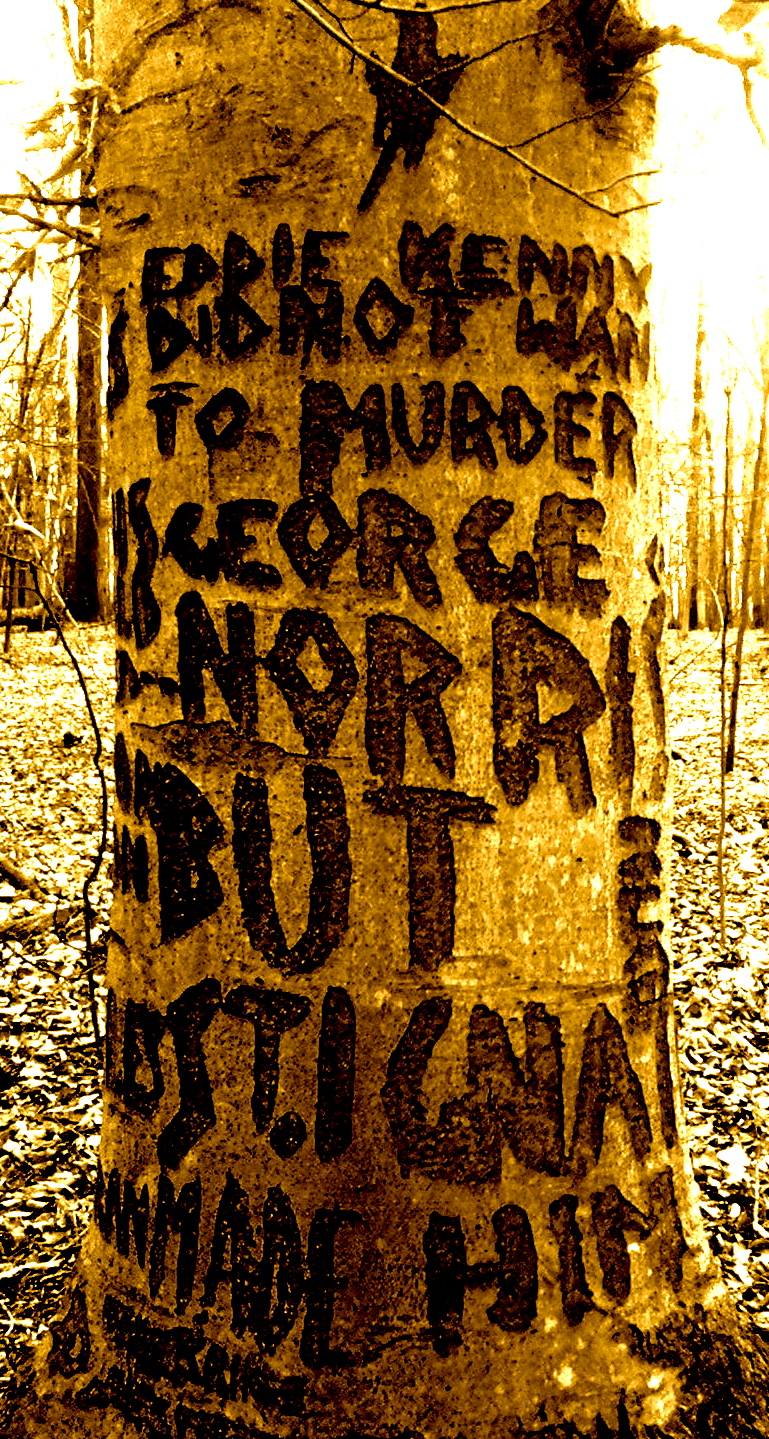
"Eddie Kenny did not want to murder George Norris but St. Ignatius made him"

Several of the trees contain engravings that were made by mentally ill American military veterans. Many of the trees contain the engraving "Nelson Jochnou", possibly the name of one of the engravers. The engravings contain religious rhetoric, political statements, personal memoirs, and outbursts. Sometimes the carvings are a combination of political and religious statements. For example, one tree is engraved with "Christ said to police there was no Second World War." Other engravings include:

- "Nelson Jochnou 1958"
- "King of Kings and Lord of Lords"
- "All authority is given unto He in Heaven and Earth"
- "Battle of Armageddon"
- "Infantry"
- "Armory"
- "Nixon"
- "Help"
- "Murder"
- "Police"
- "1920"
- "1911"
- "Monks didnt Want to Murder Taylor Holly"
- "Eddie Kenny did not want to murder George Norris but St. Ignatius made him"
