= Bridal Oak =

Largest tree in Norway

Coordinates: 60°25′21.40572″N 6°32′34.59084″E

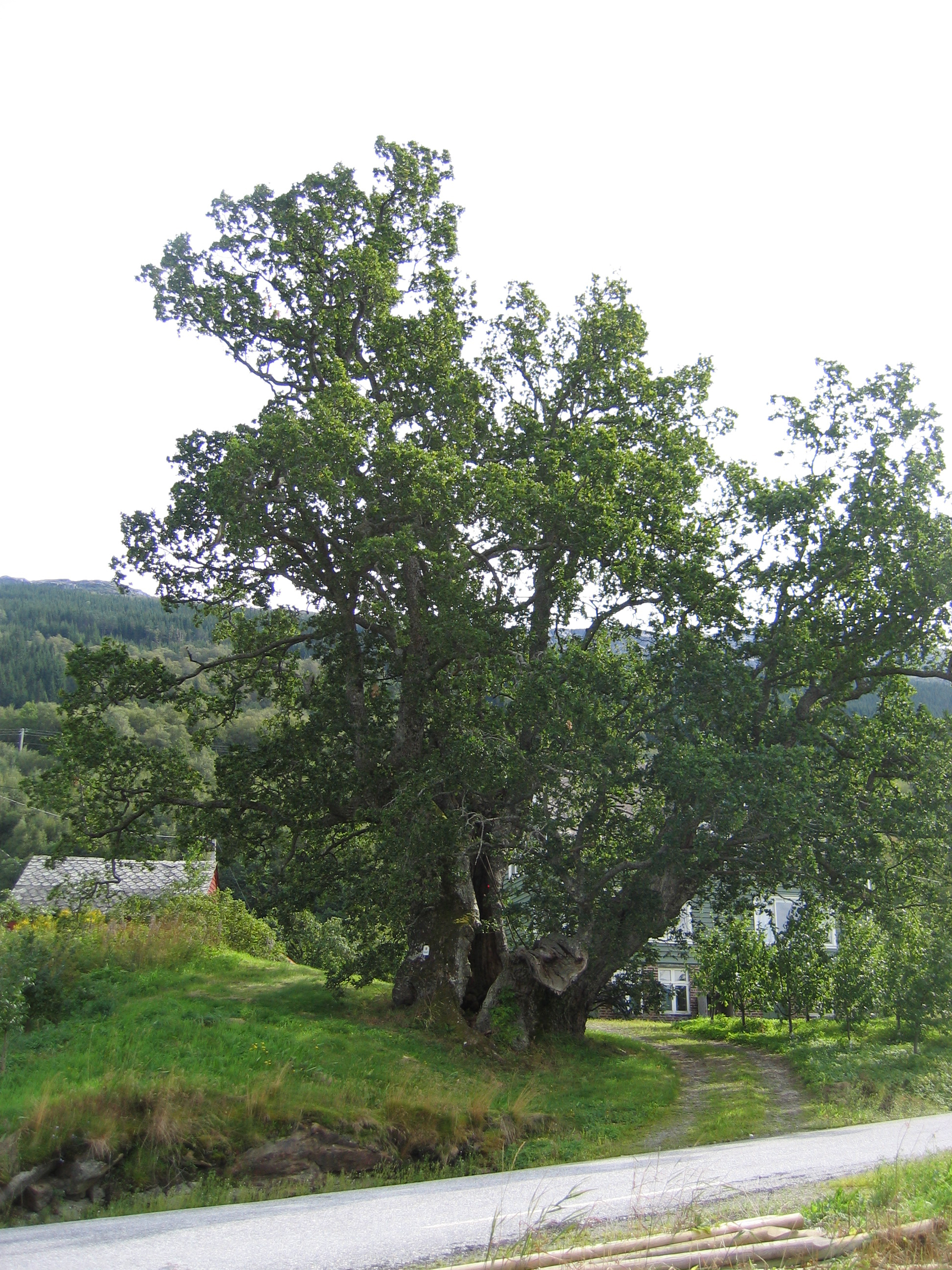
Brureika

The Bridal Oak (in Norwegian: Brureika) is an oak tree (Quercus robur) which in 2007 was named Norway's largest tree (The circumference 1.3 m (4 ft 3 in) above ground is 10.80 m (35.4 ft)).

The tree is located on the Lothe farm at Utne in Hardanger, Norway. The oak tree was preserved and protected by law as Lote naturminne on May 21, 1920. The trunk is hollow, divided into two parts with common roots, and the two parts are joined by two iron bars to avoid further splitting. Although the tree is hollow and split, the foliage is still lush.

== The name ==
The name comes from past times, when bridal gatherings gathered under this tree after marriage.

== Gallery ==
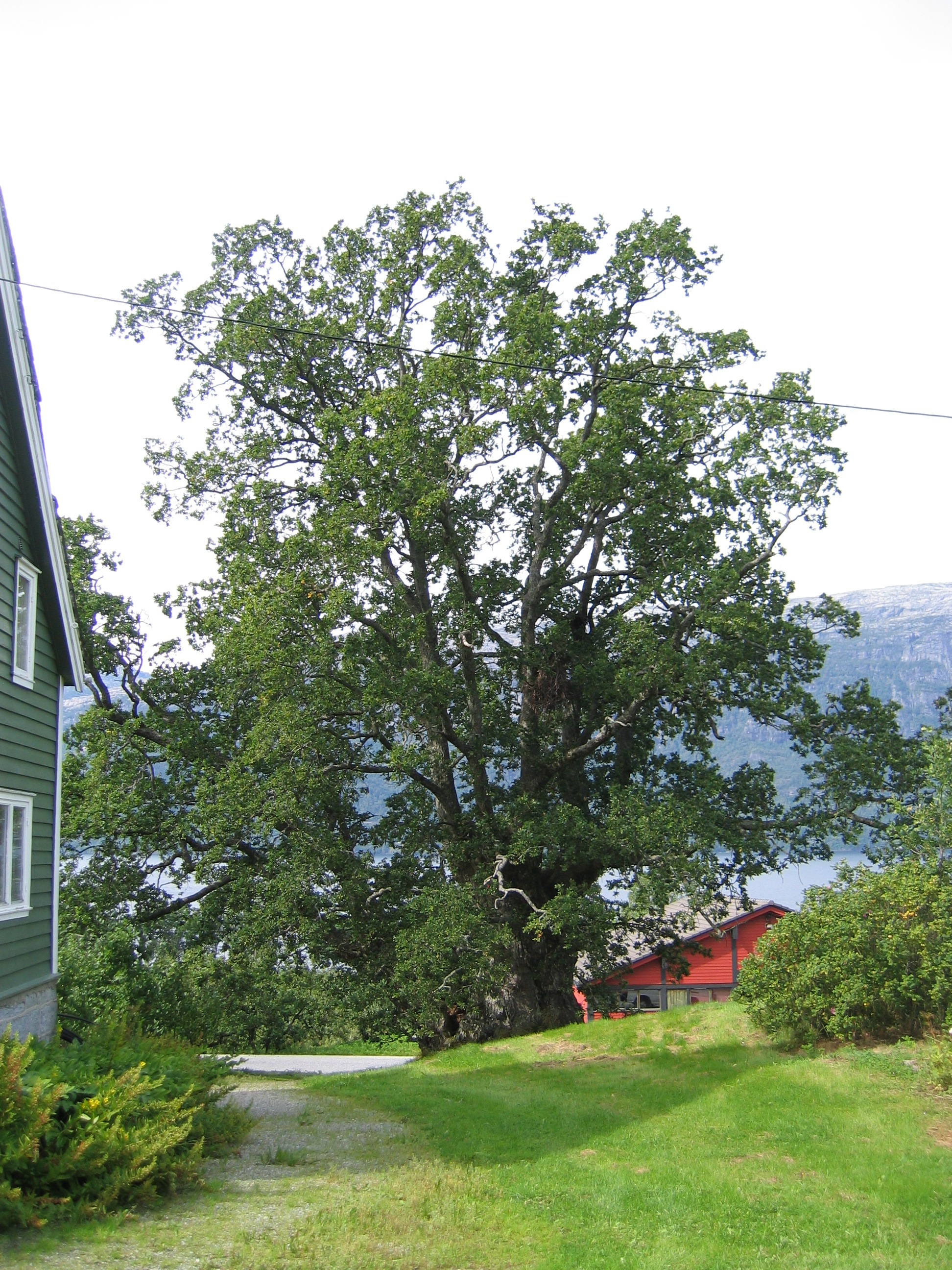
Brureika, 2009

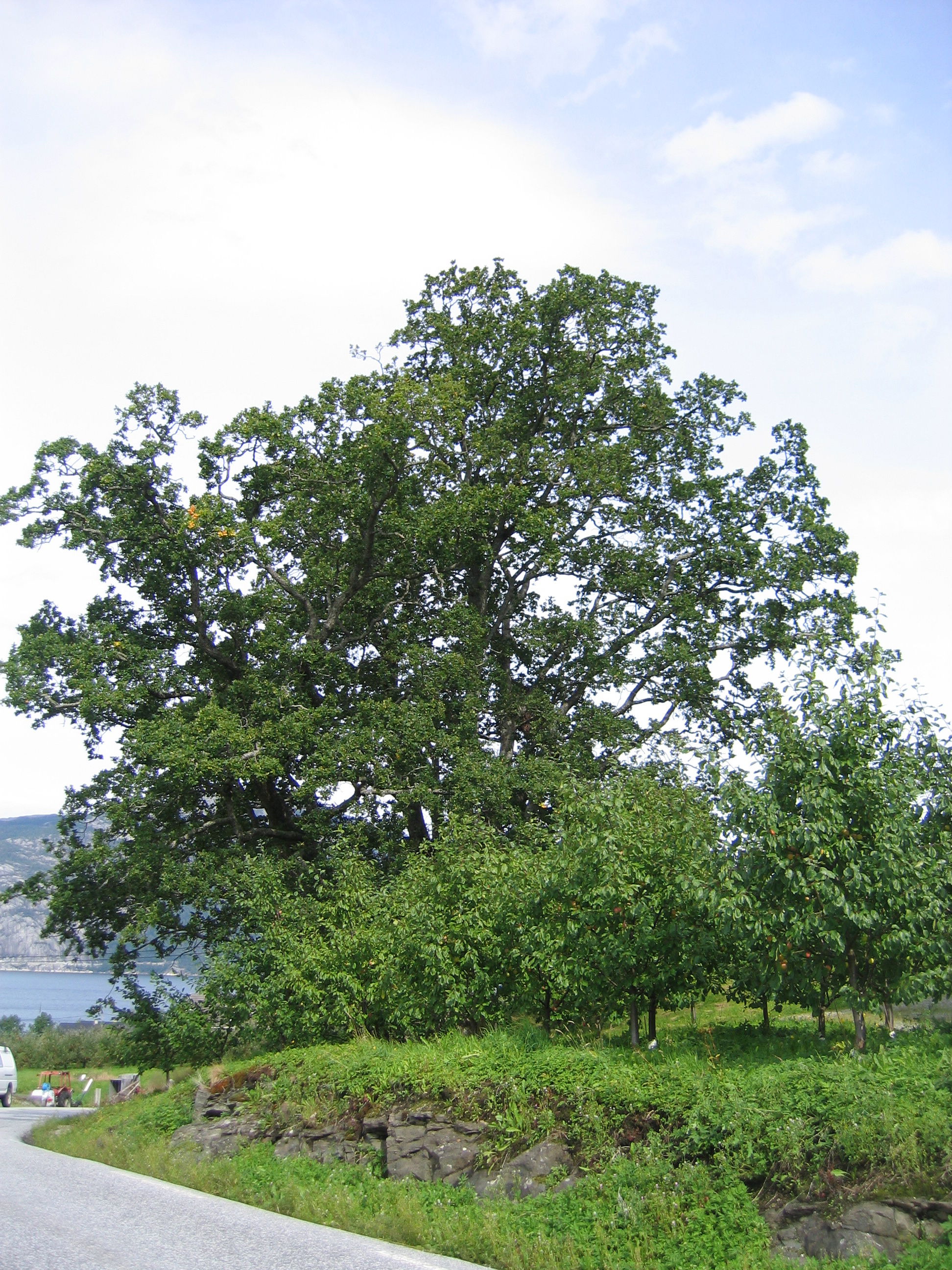
Brureika, 2009

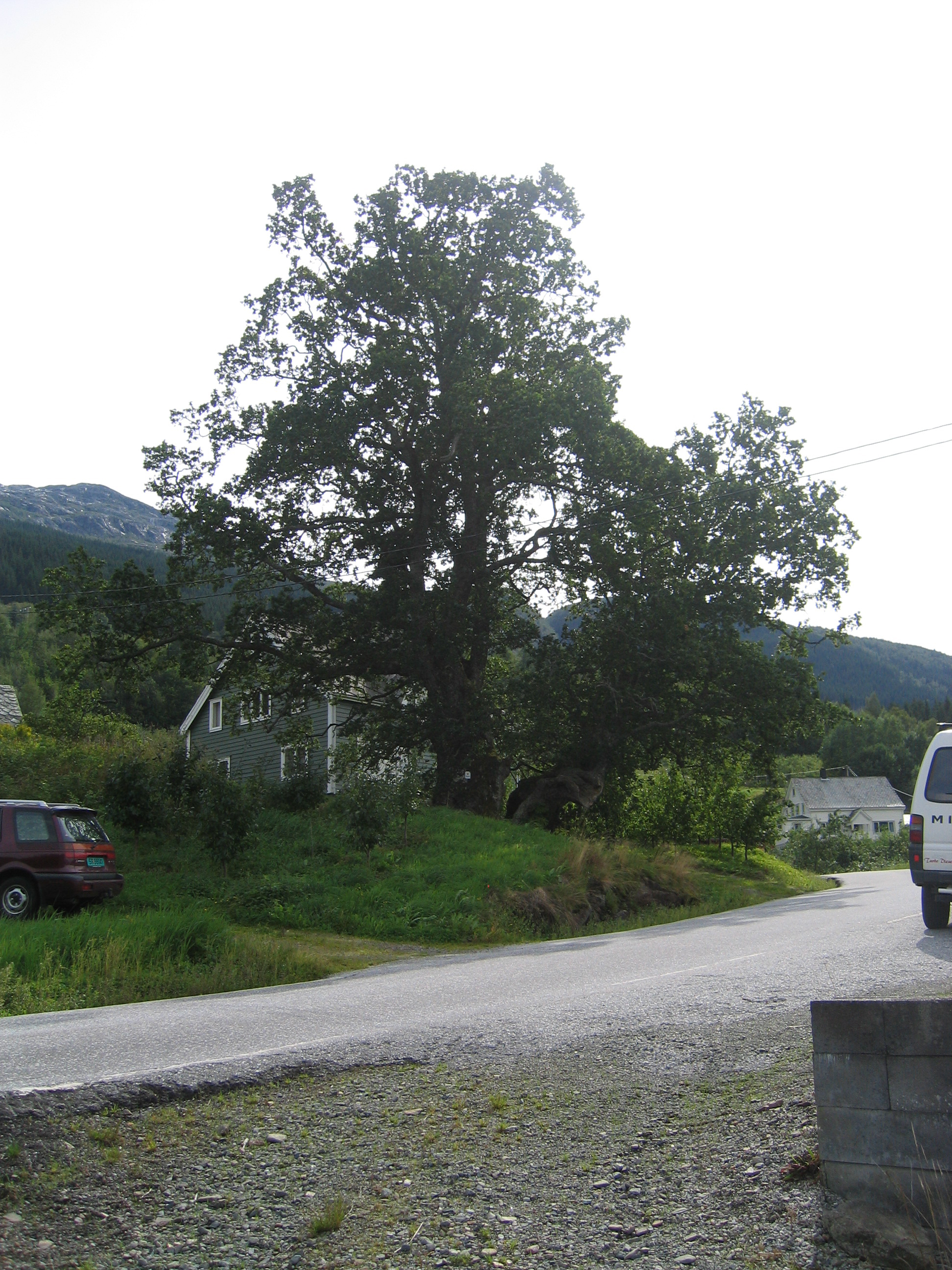
Brureika, 2009

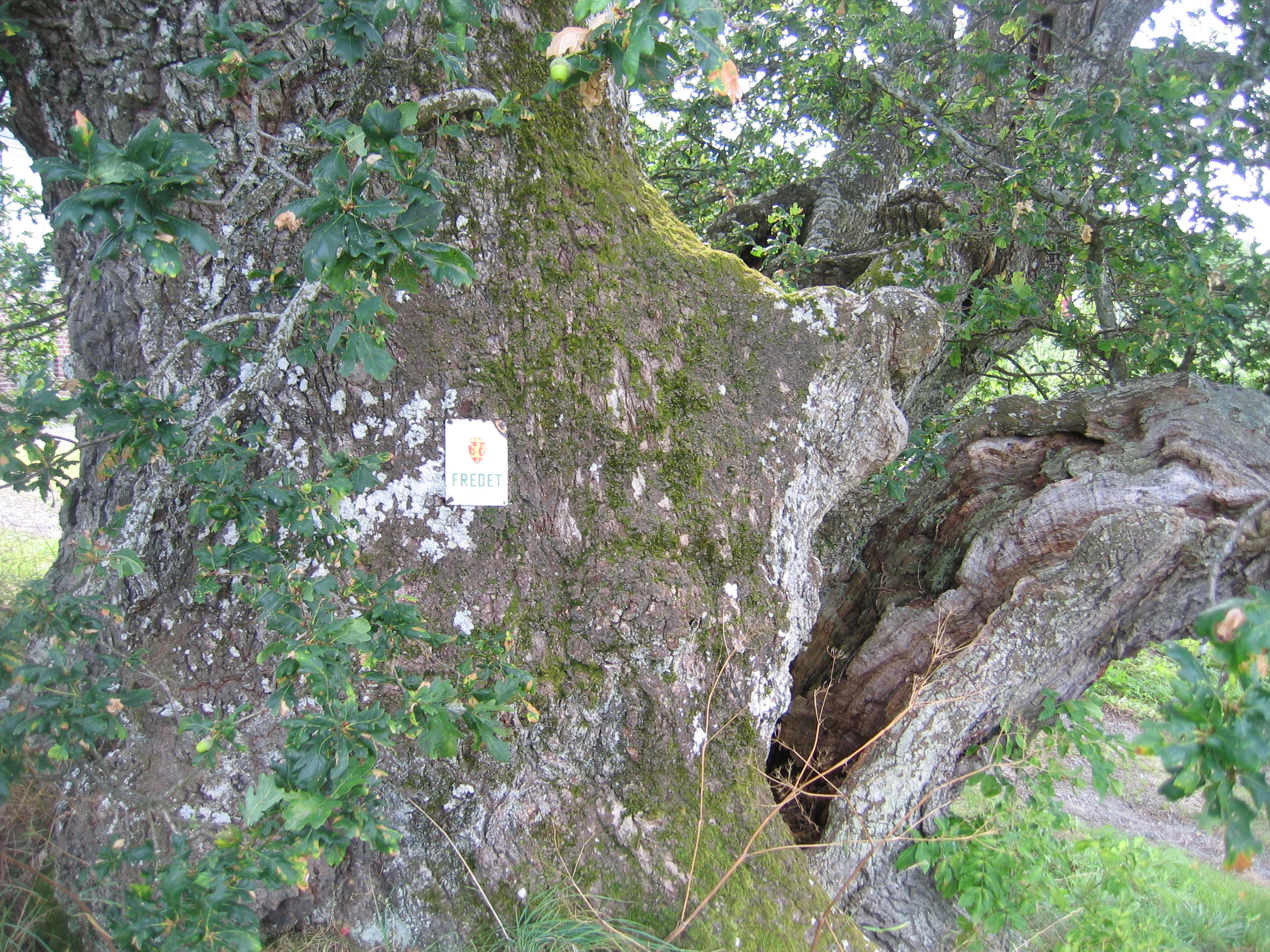
Brureika, 2009

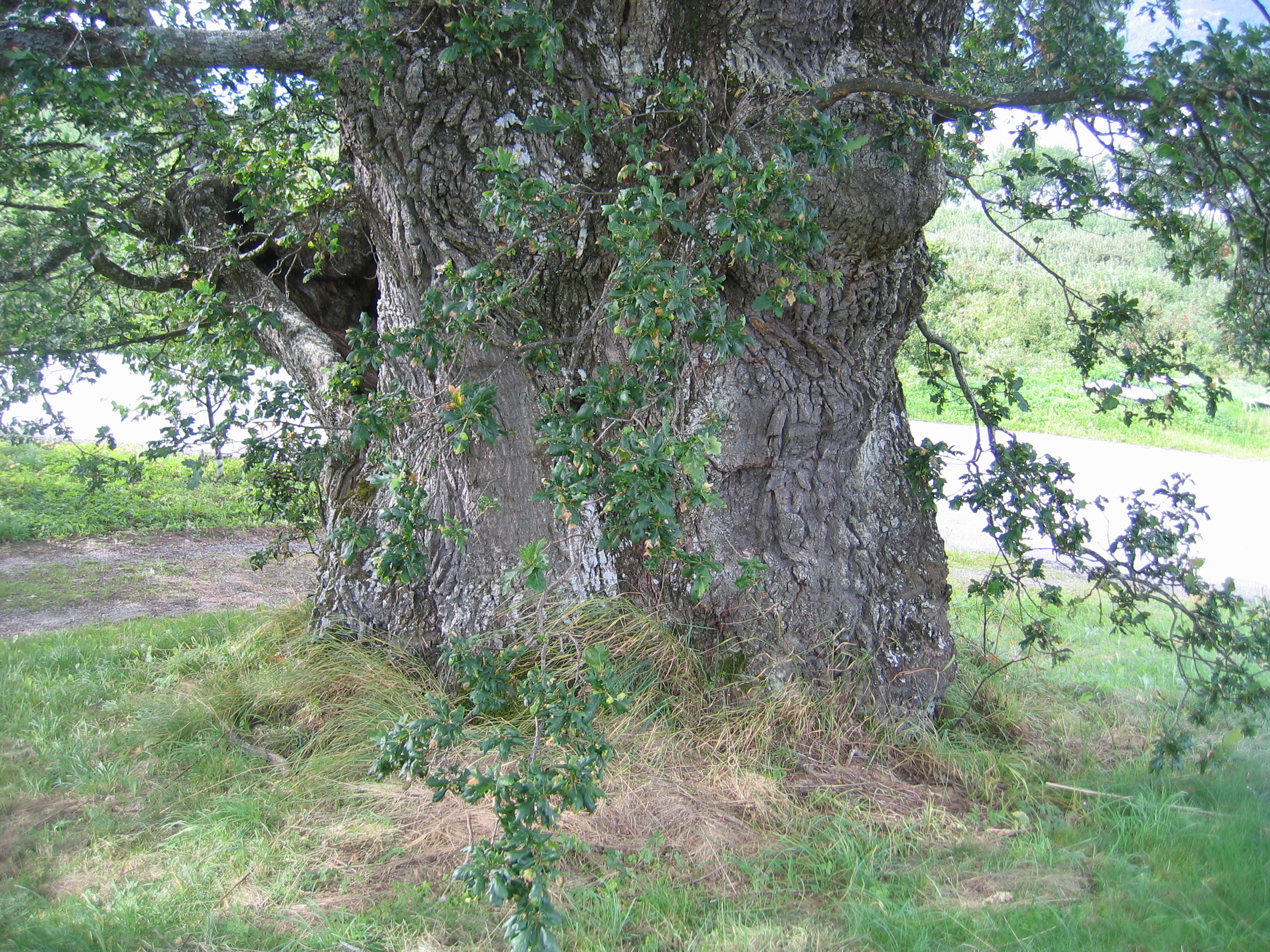
Brureika, 2009

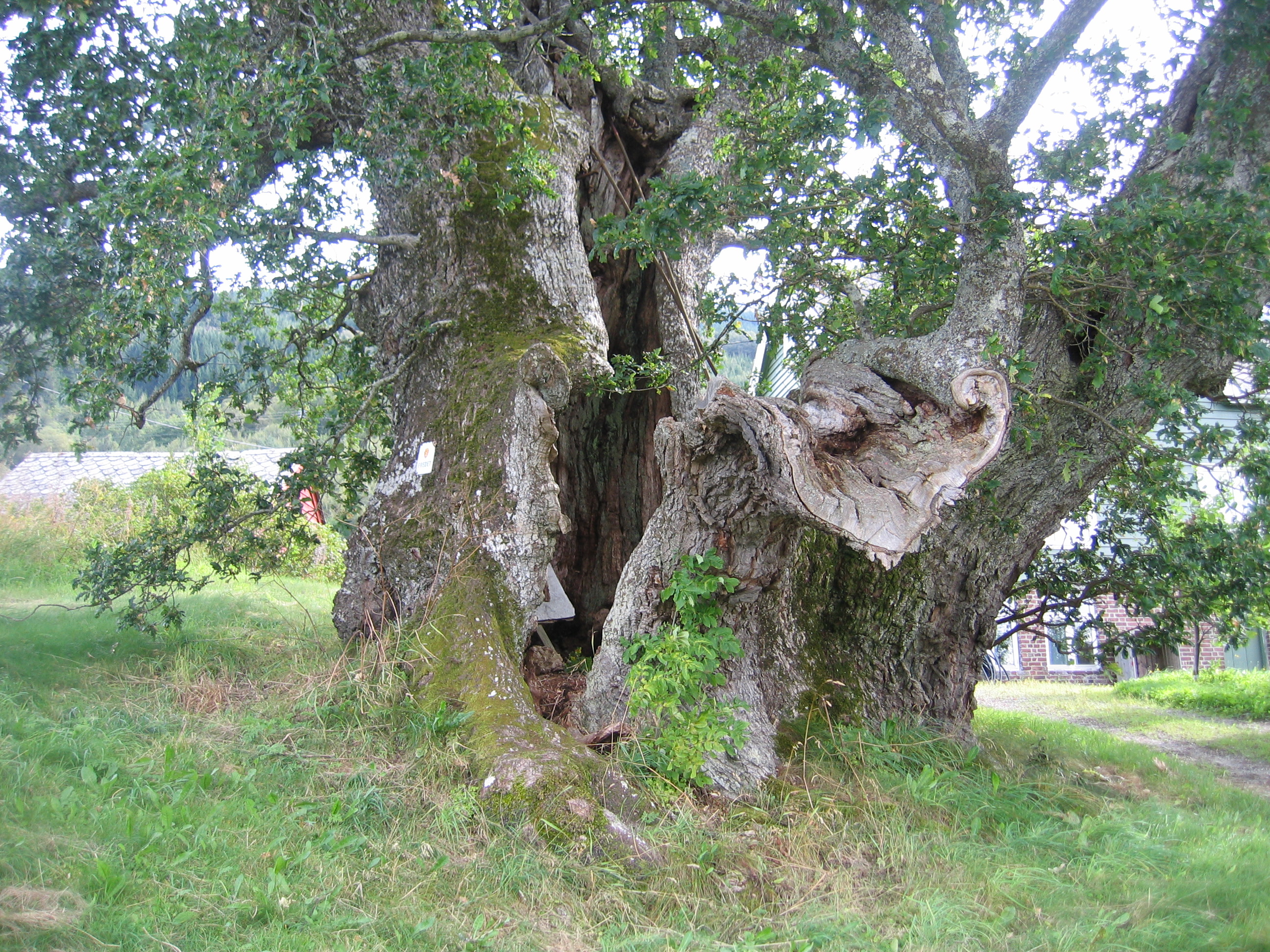
Brureika, 2009
