= Tree of the Year (United Kingdom) =

Award for special trees in the United Kingdom

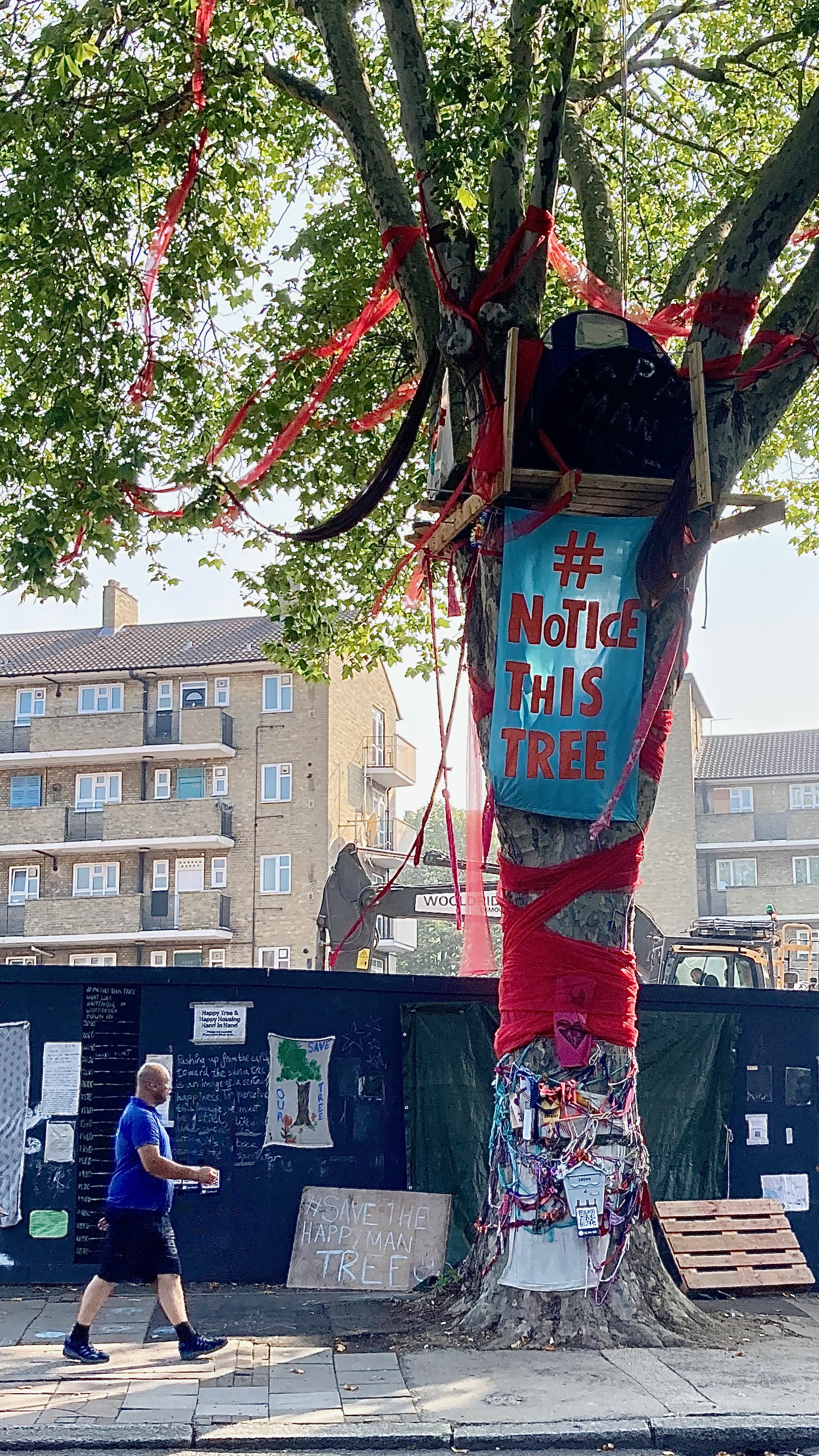
The Happy Man Tree, England's Tree of the Year 2020

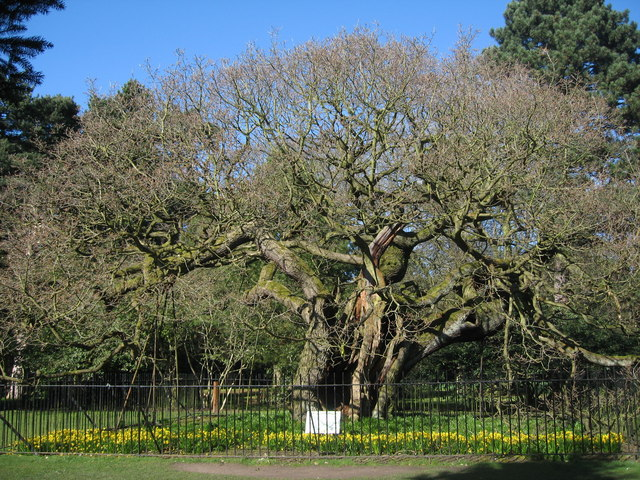
The Allerton Oak, Britain's and England's Tree of the Year 2019

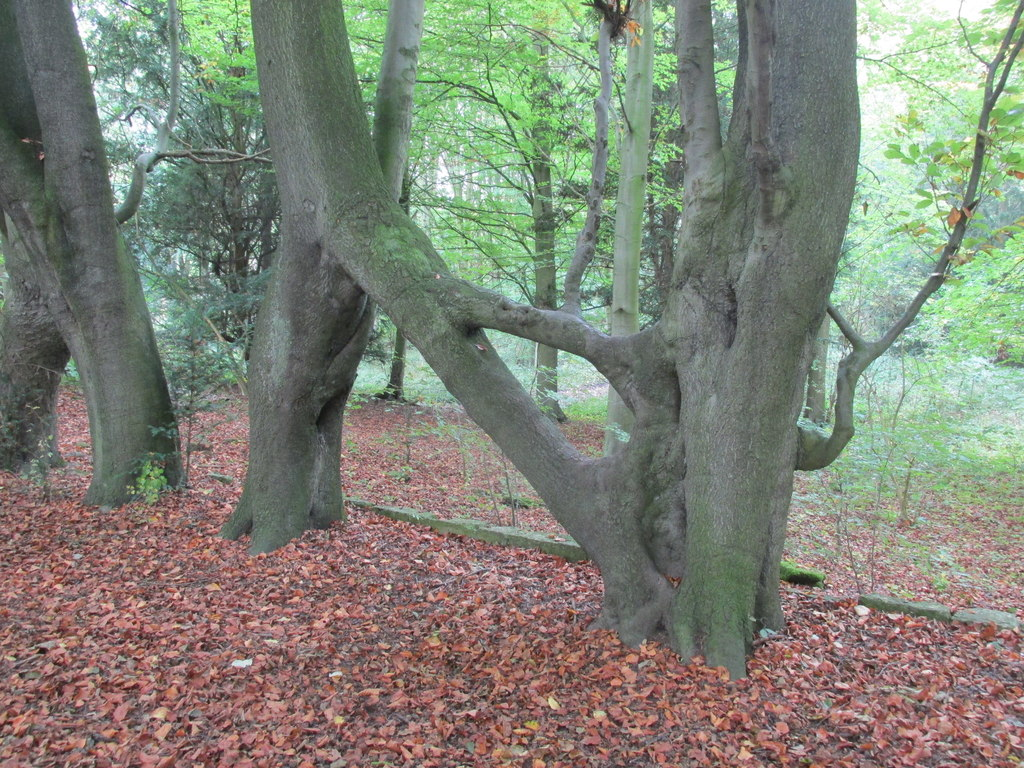
Nellie's Tree, Britain's and England's Tree of the Year 2018

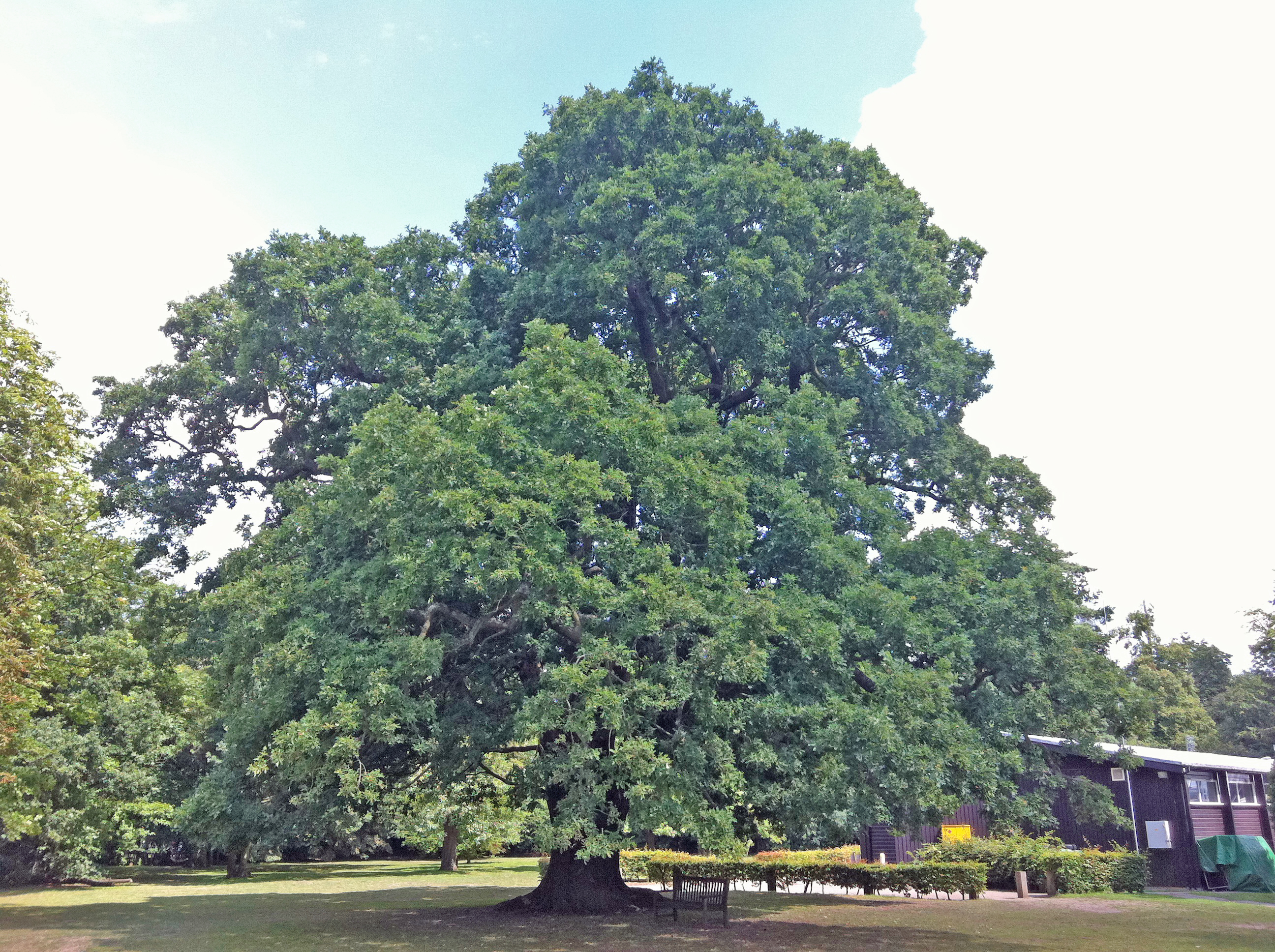
The Gilwell Oak, Britain's and England's Tree of the Year 2017

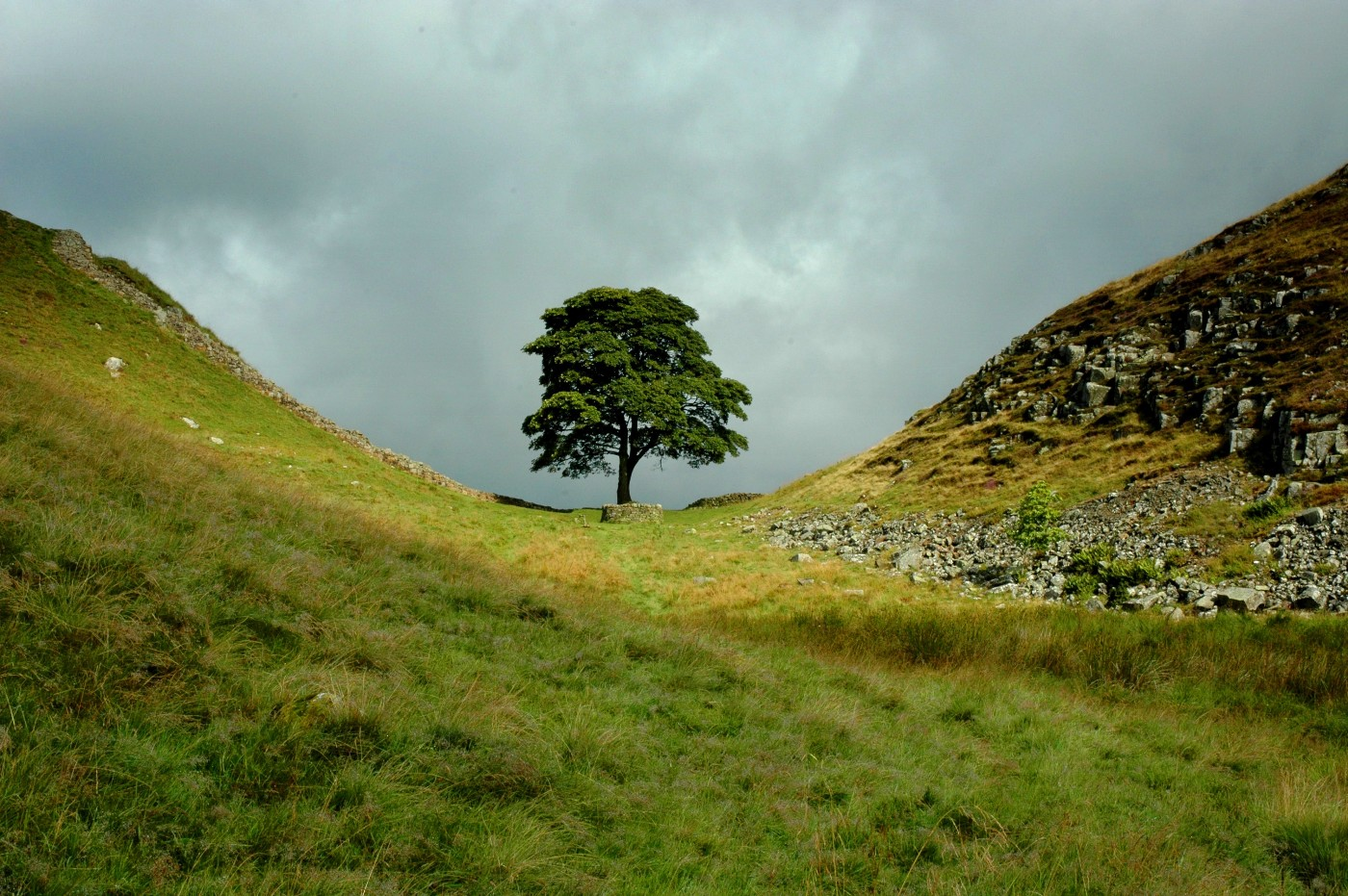
The Sycamore Gap Tree, England's Tree of the Year 2016

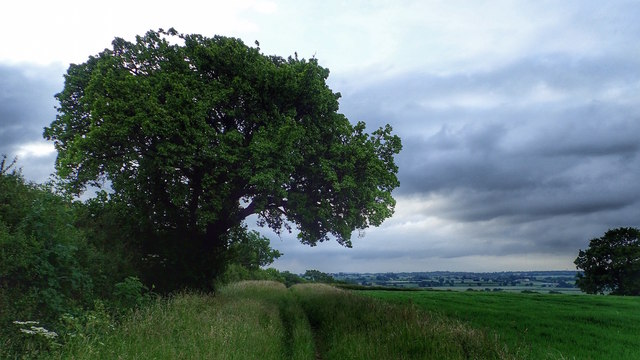
The Cubbington Pear Tree, England's Tree of the Year 2015

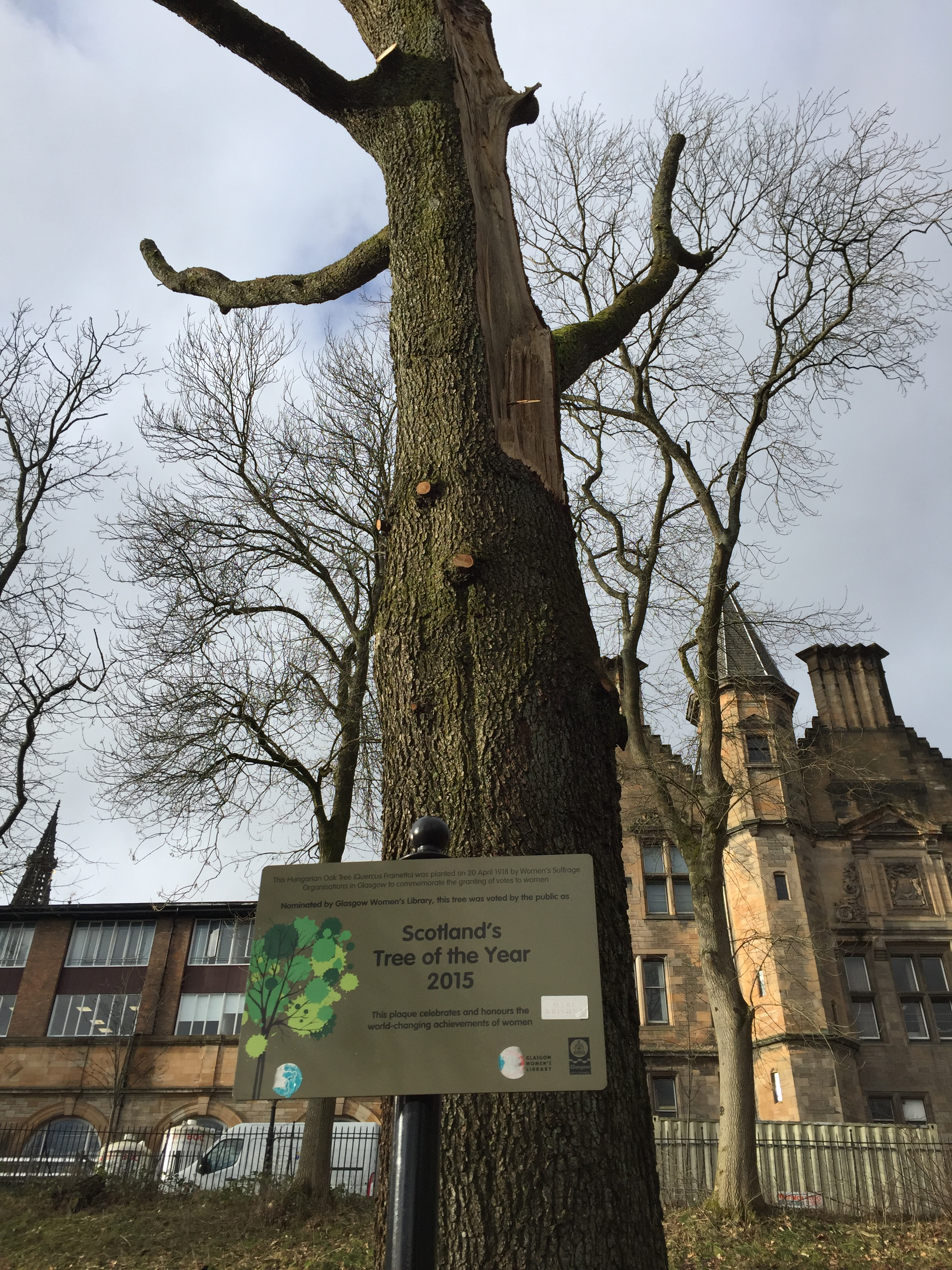
The Suffrage Oak, Scotland's Tree of the Year 2015

The Tree of the Year competition is held in the United Kingdom in autumn each year by the Woodland Trust, a nationwide conservation charity. Nominated trees are shortlisted by a panel of experts, before going to public votes to select a tree of the year for each of the four constituent countries of the United Kingdom. The panel then selects one of these to become Britain's tree of the year and be nominated for the following year's European Tree of the Year. The competition has been run each year since 2014.

== History ==
The European Tree of the Year competition has been running since 2011 and selects a tree from participating countries (now 13 in number) by public vote. It was inspired by an earlier Czech national contest. Most countries hold a national poll to select their entrant for each year. Nominations are made in the year preceding the award. The United Kingdom did not enter the competition until 2013 when Niel Gow's Oak and the Oak at the Gate of the Dead were nominated for Scotland and Wales respectively for entry into the 2014 award. These trees finished seventh and ninth out of the 10 entries for that year.

The following year, the Woodland Trust took responsibility for nominating British entries into the competition. It instigated national competitions in England, Wales and Scotland. The winners of this competition were entered into the European Tree of the Year awards for 2015.

In 2015, the British awards were widened to include Northern Ireland. The Woodland Trust altered the format in 2016, introducing an additional round of voting to name a single tree of the year for the whole country. All four national winners were still entered into the European competition. As of 2017, only the overall British winner is entered into the European Tree of the Year awards.

In previous years each national winning tree would receive a £1,000 grant from the People's Postcode Lottery to be used for any purpose in relation to the tree – this could range from a survey or health check, remedial works, plaques and signs or a celebratory event. A selection of the shortlisted trees also received grants of £500.

== Format ==
The four national competitions are held across July, August, and September, with ten shortlisted trees ranked by public vote via the Woodland Trust’s website. Nominations can be submitted by any individual or organisation up to 30 June. Of these, nine trees are selected by a panel of independent experts, with a tenth added to the shortlist as a public nomination. All ten then go forward to the public vote. Following the public vote, one of the four trees is selected by a panel of experts to become Britain's Tree of the Year and be nominated as the entry into the European awards, voting for which runs through January and February of the following year. In 2018 the Woodland Trust switched format, such that the overall British winner was decided by a public vote co-ordinated with the BBC's The One Show.

In 2019 the competition reverted to a panel of judges to select the overall British entrant, though the title "Britain's Tree of the Year" was not used. Individual national trees of the year were not chosen in 2021, with a public vote selecting the winner from a shortlist of ten from across Britain. Individual winners were again not chosen in 2022, with Britain's Tree of the Year being selected by judges from a shortlist of twelve from across all four countries.

== Results ==
=== Britain's Tree of the Year ===
- 2016 Brimmon Oak
- 2017 Gilwell Oak
- 2018 Nellie's Tree
- 2019 Allerton Oak
- 2020 Survivor Tree
- 2021 Kippford Leaning Tree
- 2022 Waverley Abbey Yew
- 2023 Sweet chestnut tree in Acton Park, Wrexham
- 2024 Skipinnish Oak in Scotland, also known as the Lochaber Tree
- 2025 Argyle Street Ash in Glasgow, Scotland
- 2026 Bendy Tree, The Promenade, Newcastle, County Down, Northern Ireland

=== England's Tree of the Year ===
- 2014 Major Oak
- 2015 Cubbington Pear Tree
- 2016 Sycamore Gap Tree
- 2017 Gilwell Oak
- 2018 Nellie's Tree
- 2019 Allerton Oak
- 2020 Happy Man Tree

=== Scotland's Tree of the Year ===
- 2013 Niel Gow's Oak (Note: The UK Tree of the Year competition was not established until late 2014 but in 2013 individual trees in Scotland and Wales were entered into the 2014 European competition. Subsequent entries into the European competition have been granted only to the individual national winners for 2014–2016 and to the overall British winner from 2017.)
- 2014 Lady's Tree
- 2015 The Suffrage Oak
- 2016 Ding Dong tree
- 2017 Big Tree, Kirkwall
- 2018 Netty's Tree
- 2019 Last Ent of Affric
- 2020 Survivor Tree

=== Wales' Tree of the Year ===
- 2013 Oak at the Gate of the Dead
- 2014 Lonely Tree
- 2015 Llanarthne Oak
- 2016 Brimmon Oak
- 2017 Hollow Tree, Neath Port Talbot
- 2018 Pwllpriddog Oak
- 2019 Old Sweet Chestnut, Pontypool Park
- 2020 Chapter House Tree

=== Northern Ireland's Tree of the Year ===
- 2015 Woodvale Park Peace Tree
- 2016 Holm Oak, Kilbroney Park, Rostrevor ("Old Homer")
- 2017 Erskine House Tree
- 2018 Multi-stemmed Giant Sequoia, Castlewellan
- 2019 Invisible Tree
- 2020 – Competition not run, Woodland Trust team in this region instead celebrated the 20th anniversary of their Woods on Your Doorstep scheme.

== See also ==
- European Tree of the Year
- List of individual trees
- Tree of the Year (Portugal)
