= If Trees Could Talk =

2019 book by Holly Worton

- Book cover
- Author: Holly Worton
- Language: English
- Genre: Tree lore, Spirituality, Self-help
- Published: 12 April 2019
- Publisher: Tribal Publishing
- Publication place: United Kingdom, United States of America
- Media type: Print (Paperback) & E-book.
- Pages: 324
- ISBN: 1911161245
- Website: https://www.hollyworton.com/

If Trees Could Talk: Life Lessons from the Wisdom of the Woods is a non-fiction book by American author and podcaster, Holly Worton that offers spirituality and self-help through making contact with nature and talking to trees.

== Summary ==
Part self-help and part spiritual, Worton's If Trees Could Talk is a guide to taking time out to connect with nature, talk to trees, and to live a happier and more fulfilled life. The author, who lives in England, believes that "all trees are living, breathing organisms that humans can connect with and talk to on a deeper level through silent, telepathic communication."

A druid, coach and healer, Worton writes about the individual trees she has encountered on her many nature walks – each with their own history, character, personality, and story; and she describes the different species of trees, and their place and reverence in pagan ways, such as that of the Order of Bards, Ovates and Druids, and the ancient alphabet, the ogham which ascribes a tree to each letter. The book is structured around this description, the stories that each individual tree has to tell, and the advice they have to offer.

== Interviews ==
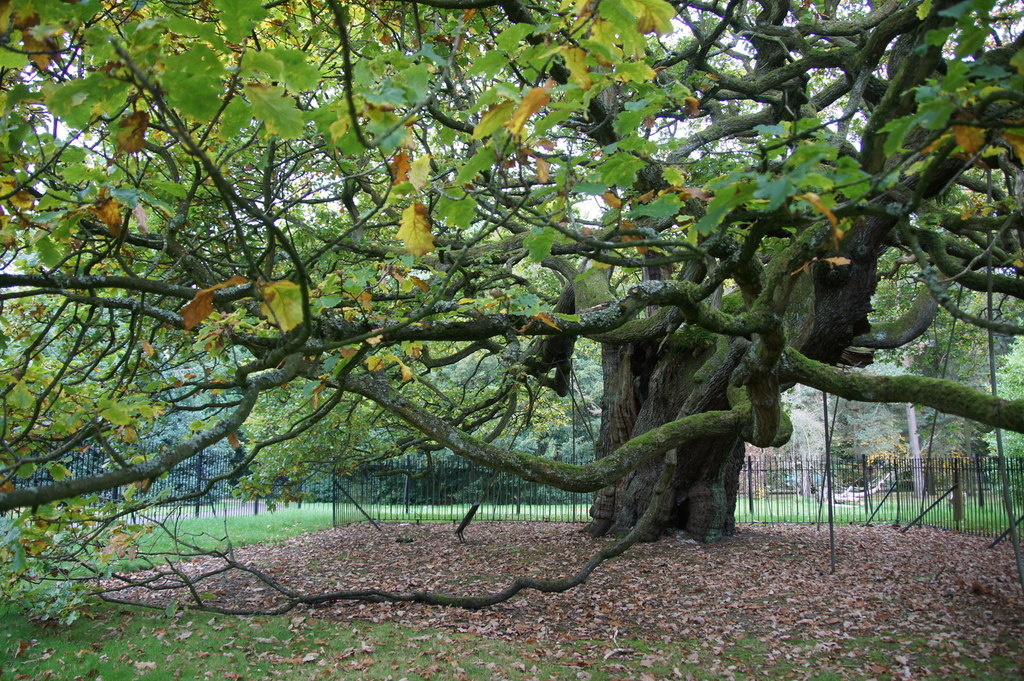
The Allerton Oak in October 2015

On 6 May 2019, Worton was interviewed on ITV's programme This Morning by television presenters Eamonn Holmes and Rochelle Humes, to talk about her new book. In a garden outside the television studios, she also gave the presenters a practical demonstration of how she communicates with trees, with the aid of a sound engineer.

On 26 February 2020, Worton was again interviewed on This Morning, by Alison Hammond and Phillip Schofield, discussing the Allerton Oak, the UK's nomination for the European Tree of the Year competition, and communicating with it.

== Reception ==
The televised item on This Morning attracted a largely humorous and dismissive response in the social media, and was reported in several newspapers, including the Daily Mirror, the Birmingham Mail, and Entertainment Daily.

Writing in the Daily Express on 13 May 2019, life coach and columnist, Carole Ann Rice is, however, more positive about the book. She describes If Trees Could Talk as "a wise and beautiful book coming at the right time for many of us." "Stop rushing, be patient, respect nature, stray from your normal path, be mindful, ask permission [to communicate with the trees]" – these, the reviewer says, are a few of the things that we can learn from the trees, and she advises the reader to "show love and respect to what grows around you" and to "learn some true lessons from the wild side of life."

== About the author ==
Originally from California in the United States, Worton has lived in Spain, Costa Rica, Mexico and Chile before moving to England. She is an author and podcaster, as well as a druid, coach and healer.

== See also ==
- Celtic sacred trees
