= Gnoll Country Park =

Park in the Vale of Neath, Wales

Coordinates: 51.6626°N 3.7869°W

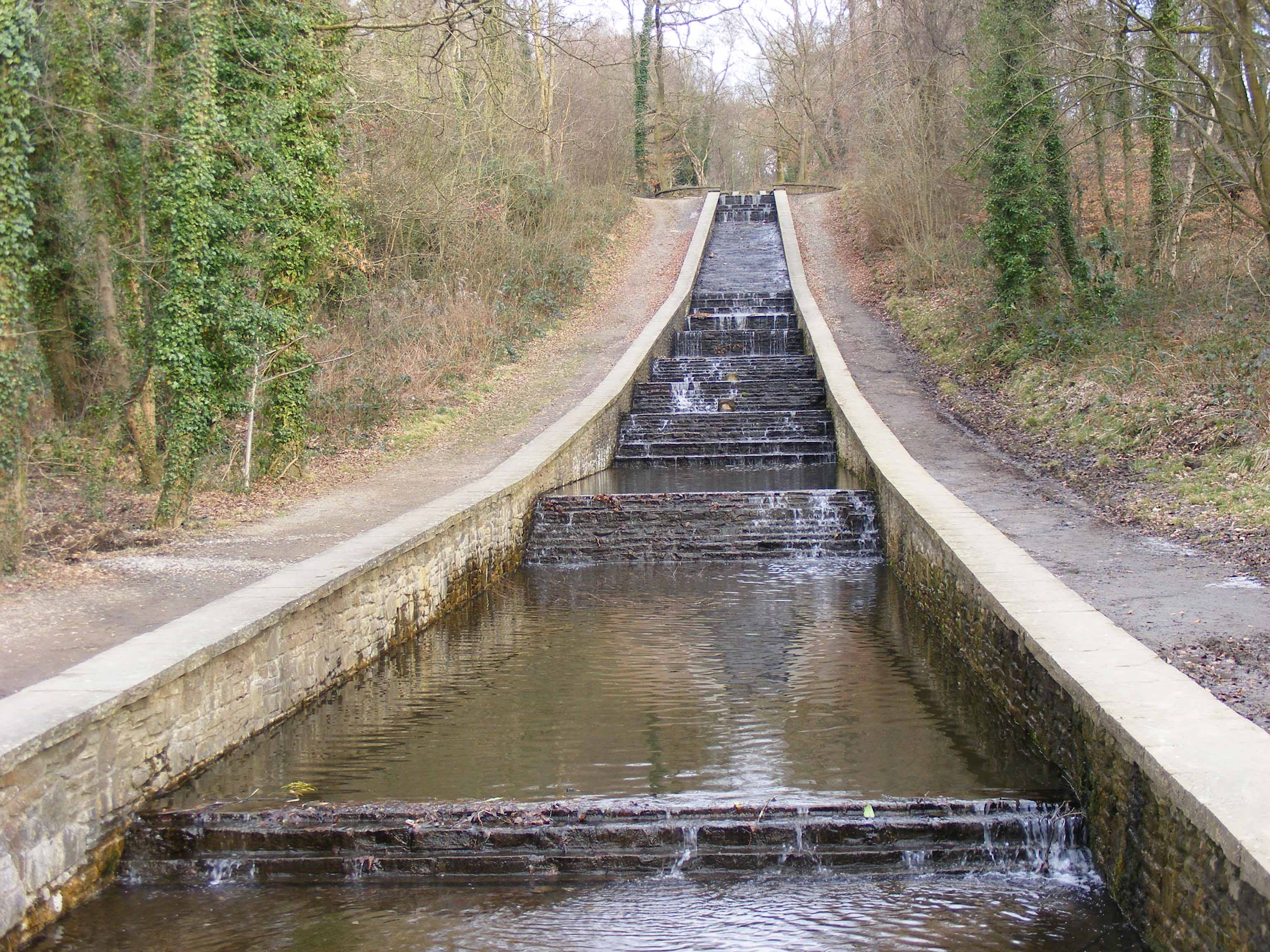
Water feature at the Gnoll Country Park

The Gnoll Country Park (or Gnoll Estate) is a park in Wales. It is an early-18th-century landscaped garden covering over 100 acres (0.40 km^{2}) in the Vale of Neath, in Neath Port Talbot county borough in south Wales. The park is designated Grade II* on the Cadw/ICOMOS Register of Parks and Gardens of Special Historic Interest in Wales.

== History ==
The estate was the property of the Mackworth family during the 18th and 19th centuries. There are few traces remaining of the house, once considered "one of the finest residences in the principality".

Historically, the estate was part of the Norman-owned territory of Neath and Afan, which also comprised Neath Abbey and Neath Castle. The first recorded individual owner was Evan ap David during the 16th century. The last of Evan's descendants to own it was Sir Herbert Evans, who died in the late 17th century. Sir Herbert's daughter and sole surviving heir, Mary, married Humphrey Mackworth (later Sir Humphrey) in 1686 and on her death ten years later, Mackworth became owner of the estate.

Mackworth extended the house (sometimes known as "Gnoll Castle"), and developed various coal mining interests locally, as well as branching out into other industries. His eldest son, Herbert Mackworth, continued his industrial interests, and developed the Gnoll copper works. Sir Herbert Mackworth, 1st Baronet, Herbert's son, increased the amount of coal mining carried out on the estate.

Through the widow of Sir Herbert's brother Robert Mackworth (died 1795), the estate passed to Capel Hanbury Leigh, Lord Lieutenant of Monmouthshire, and it was later bought by Henry Grant of Pembrokeshire and Wormley, Hertfordshire (died 1831) Shortly before his son Henry John Grant's death in 1861, there was a plan in 1857 to use the castle as a university college and some staff including the gamekeeper William Adams moved to Wormley, but instead it was purchased by a cousin Charles Evan-Thomas of Llwynmadoc, who demolished the east wing and added other architectural features. He was the father of Admiral Hugh Evan-Thomas, who was born at the Gnoll. A year after Sir Hugh's death, the Gnoll was bought by Neath corporation as a site for a war memorial. The castle was demolished in 1957.

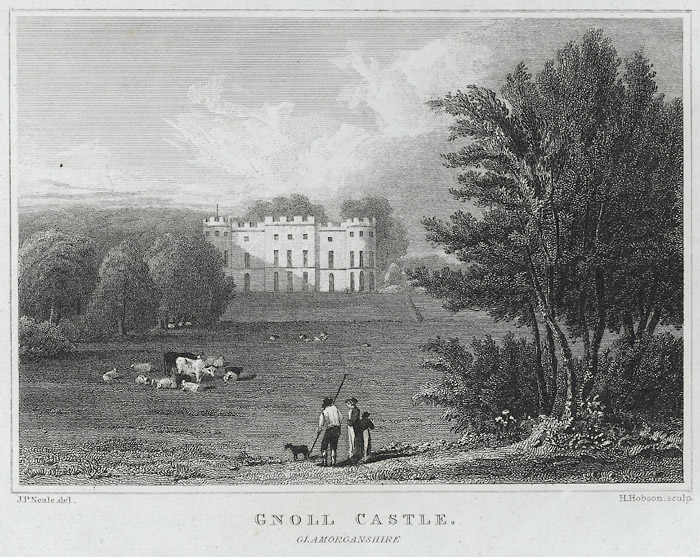
An engraving of Gnoll Castle in about 1810

== Country park ==
The park is designated Grade II* on the Cadw/ICOMOS Register of Parks and Gardens of Special Historic Interest in Wales. It features lakeside and woodland walks, restored formal cascades, a grotto, a coarse fishery, four ponds, a play area, an adventure playground and a visitor centre exploring the history and evolution of the estate. It has a shop, toilet facilities and a cafè. Entry to the park is free of charge, but there are parking charges. The remains of some of the estate buildings, such as an ice house, tower and fishpond house, are still visible.

== Hollow Tree ==
The Hollow Tree is located near to the visitor centre and the fishpond. It serves as the finish line for the three courses of the weekly Gnoll Parkrun. The tree, an oak, has been completely hollow since at least the 1950s and children have played inside it for generations. It is fitted with reinforcing bars and, despite its condition, continues to produce leaves and acorns each year. The tree was one of 216 nominations for the British Tree of the Year competition in 2017 and was selected by an expert panel to be one of six on the Welsh shortlist. It received 64% of votes in the subsequent public poll, winning the Welsh competition and receiving a £1000 tree care grant from the People's Postcode Lottery. The tree was not selected from the national winners for entry into the European Tree of the Year competition, losing out to the Gilwell Oak.
