= Argyle Street ash tree =

European ash tree in Glasgow, Scotland

Coordinates: 55°51′56.4″N 4°17′15.3″W

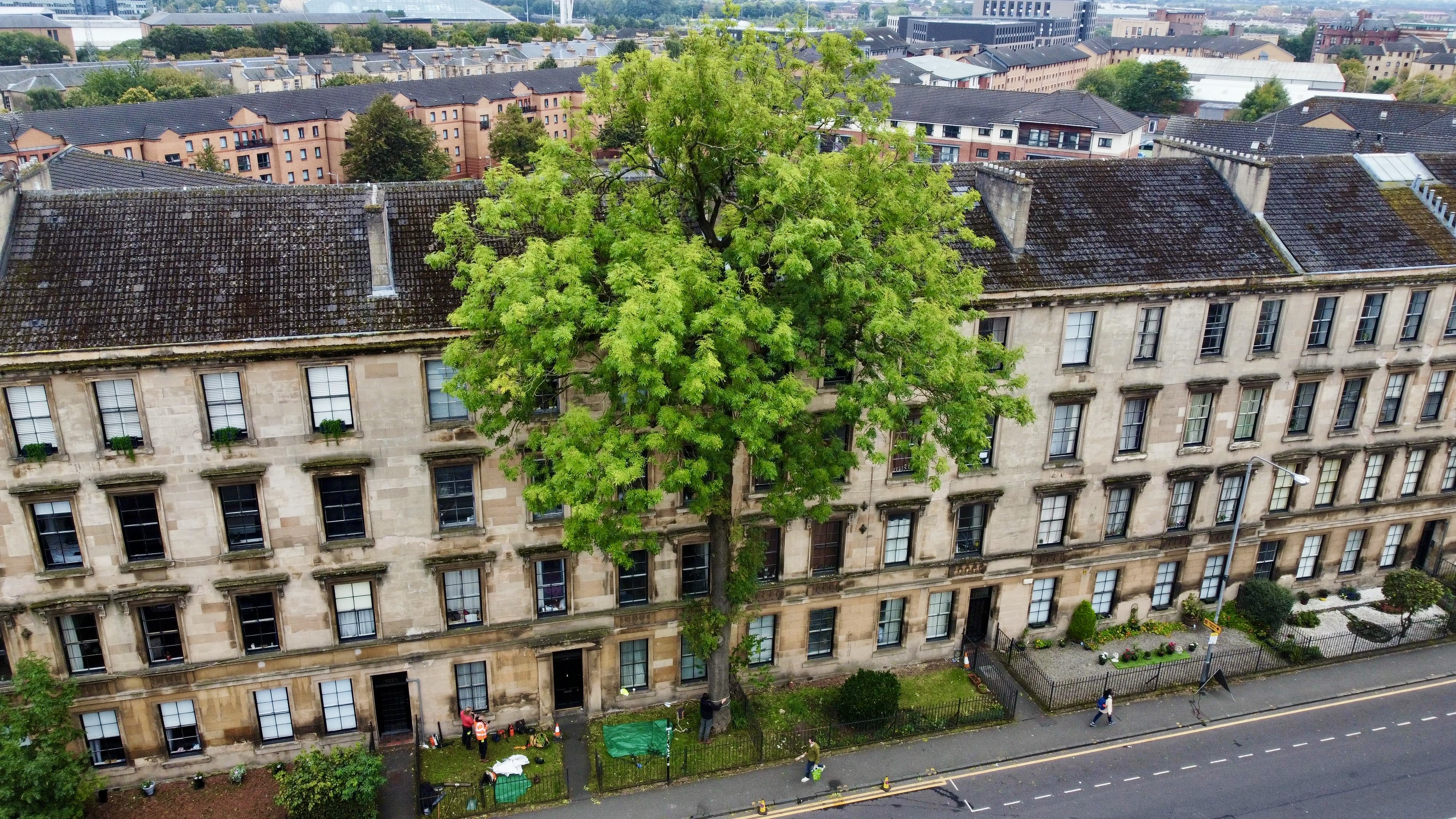
The Argyle Street Ash, September 2024

The Argyle Street Ash is a European ash tree on Argyle Street in Glasgow, Scotland.

== History ==
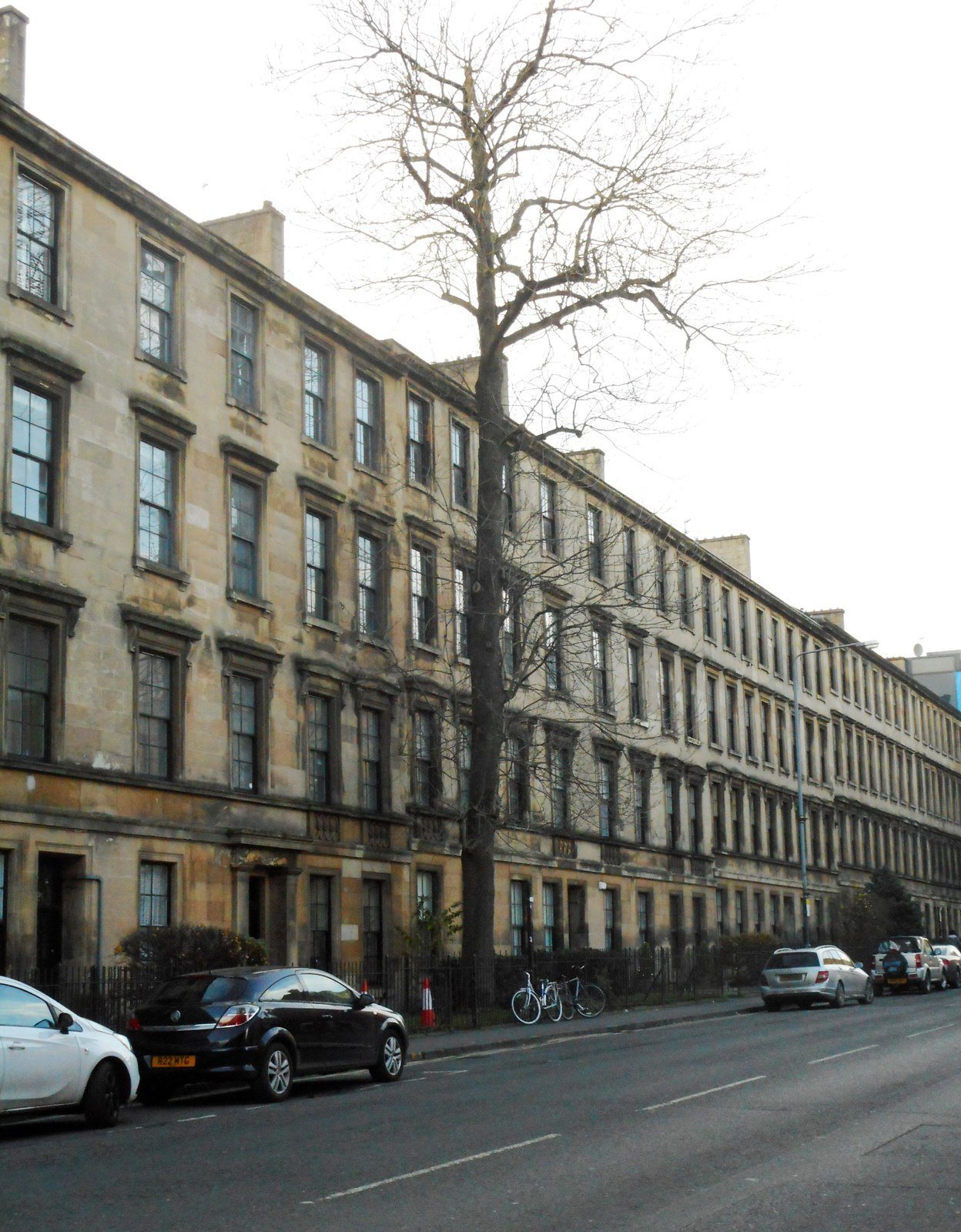
Without leaves in December 2018

The ash tree is situated outside Franklin Terrace (number 1223) on Argyle Street in the Finnieston district of Glasgow and is the only tree on the street. In his 1951 book From Glasgow's Treasure Chest James Cowan describes the tree as "straight as a ship's mast" and "quite the most graceful ash I have seen". Cowan records that the ash had been planted by accident in the 1850s when the residents of the adjacent recently-built tenement brought primrose roots back from a holiday to plant in the front garden and an ash seed was transplanted unknowingly. By the time of Cowan's writing the tree was already 75 feet (23 m) tall, higher than the tenement. He records how once a cat was trapped in the tree for two days before being rescued by the fire brigade. The height of the tree and lack of side branches is likely due to its shaded location. Cowan thought the tree could survive for another 75 years.

The Argyle Street ash tree is protected by a tree preservation order, the first tree in Glasgow to receive one. It has been subject to removal of significant amounts of deadwood several times in the early 2020s. It has only been mildly affected by the Hymenoscyphus fraxineus (ash dieback) fungus that has destroyed many ash trees across the UK, and retains more than 75% of its canopy. Its urban setting, where leaf litter is frequently swept away, and isolation (it is more than 100 metres (330 ft) away from the closest neighbouring ash tree) may have helped its survival and avoidance of reinfection. The adjacent buildings provide heat and paved surfaces reduce humidity that may also have helped limit the impact of the disease.

== Tree of the Year ==
The Argyle Street ash was nominated for the 2025 Tree of the Year award by David Treanor, a local arborist who manages the tree. After a public vote the tree was named winner of the award on 25 September; the theme of that year's award was "rooted in culture". It is the second year in succession that a Scottish tree has won the award. Among the other nine trees shortlisted were those nominated by the Member of the Scottish Parliament for Glasgow, Paul Sweeney, and Stuart Murdoch of Belle and Sebastian. Nine of the entries on the shortlist were picked by a panel of experts, the Argyle Street ash was selected as the tenth wildcard entry, by the public. The Argyle Street ash tree has been nominated to represent the UK in the 2026 European Tree of the Year awards.

== See also ==
- List of individual trees
- Trees for Cities
