= Cubbington Pear Tree =

Tree in Warwickshire, England

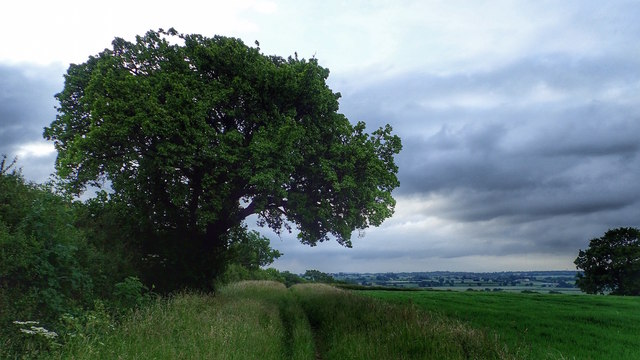
- The Cubbington Pear Tree in June 2015
- Interactive map of Cubbington Pear Tree
- Species: European wild pear (Pyrus communis var. communis)
- Location: Cubbington, Warwickshire, England
- Coordinates: 52.3113°N 1.4836°W
- Date seeded: circa 1760
- Date felled: 20 October 2020

The Cubbington Pear Tree was a wild pear tree located near Cubbington in Warwickshire, England. Around 250 years old, it was the second largest wild pear tree in the country and a noted local landmark. In 2015 the tree was voted England's Tree of the Year. A Parliamentary petition was launched in September 2020 to save the tree from being cut down for HS2 and a month later had over 20,000 signatures triggering an official government response. It was felled as part of the High Speed 2 railway development on 20 October 2020.

== Description ==
The Cubbington Pear Tree was identified as a specimen of Pyrus communis var. communis, and is listed as such in the Champion Tree Register. It is located on the top of a hill near to South Cubbington Wood, Cubbington. The tree sat on private land but near to a public footpath from which it was visible. Thought to be around 250 years old, the Cubbington Pear Tree may have been the United Kingdom's oldest wild pear tree. The tree was the second largest wild pear tree in the country, measuring some 3.78 metres (12.4 ft) in girth. Despite its age the tree continued to blossom and bear fruit until the end of its life. The tree was entered onto the Tree Register of the British Isle as a national champion (the oldest or largest known specimen of a particular species).

== HS2 ==
In 2011 the Cubbington Pear Tree was identified as under threat from the proposed High Speed 2 (HS2) Phase 1 railway line between London and Birmingham, becoming one of 20 pear trees to be threatened by the scheme. An expert from Warwickshire Museum visited the site to record and assess the tree. Representatives from HS2 said that the tree cannot be relocated as the lower trunk is hollow. They instead proposed to take cuttings from the tree and plant seedlings from it nearby as a replacement. The tree trunk was to be placed in the South Cubbington Wood to form a habitat for insects, fungi and plants.

The removal of the tree was opposed by the Cubbington Action Group who instead proposed that this section of the line be tunnelled beneath the tree. A petition in support of this proposal was sent to the HS2 Parliamentary select committee, but the scheme was rejected on economic grounds, with an estimated cost of £46 million. In preparation for its removal the Shuttleworth College successfully took cuttings from the Cubbington Pear Tree by September 2017. The Cubbington Action Group led a series of walks to view the tree in April and May 2018 to see it in bloom for the "last time". Preliminary works for HS2 in this area had commenced by May 2018.

In October 2019, local residents set up a protest encampment in South Cubbington Wood to protect the Cubbington Pear Tree and other nearby woodland. A parliamentary petition was launched in September 2020 and received 20,000 signatures of support. A formal response from the Department for Transport stated "HS2 Ltd explored all possible options to avoid removing the tree, but due to its age and condition, removal cannot be avoided" and that 40 new trees had been grown from cuttings from the pear, to be grown locally. They also stated that the stump and roots of the tree would be relocated to allow it an opportunity to regrow. The tree was cut down on 20 October 2020. Some of the wood from the tree was donated to a local woodworker.

In October 2023 it was reported that the transplanted stump had grown new shoots showing that at that time the tree was still alive.

== Tree of the Year ==
The Cubbington Pear Tree was entered into the English Tree of the Year competition in 2015 along with more than 200 others. It was selected by the competition's panel of experts for the 10-strong shortlist for the public vote. It won the competition having garnered more than 10,000 votes and beating famous trees such as the Ankerwycke Yew in Berkshire, the Boscobel Oak in Shropshire and the Glastonbury Thorn in Somerset. It was subsequently described by the Warwickshire Wildlife Trust as the "poster-boy for all the trees along the route of HS2 ... that are under threat from the project".

The tree was subsequently entered into the 2016 European Tree of the Year competition where it came 8th out of 15 entries with 7,858 votes.
