= Lonely Tree =

Landmark tree in Powys, Wales

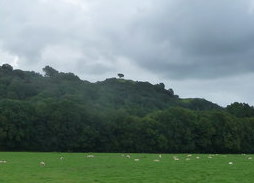
- The Lonely Tree atop Green Hall Hill in 2012
- Interactive map of Lonely Tree
- Species: Scots pine (Pinus sylvestris)
- Location: Llanfyllin, Powys, Wales
- Coordinates: 52.7624°N 3.2506°W
- Date seeded: Before 1815
- Date felled: February 2014
- Custodian: Llanfyllin Town Council

The Lonely Tree was a Scots pine on a hill near Llanfyllin, Powys, Wales. Visible from much of the town it was a local landmark with several traditions attached to it. The tree was blown over during a storm in February 2014, and despite efforts to save it, the tree was found to be dead in June 2015. The tree was voted Welsh Tree of the Year for 2014 and finished tenth in the European Tree of the Year awards for 2015. Seventeen saplings have been planted nearby in the hope that one will grow to replace the tree.

== Description and history ==
The Lonely Tree was a Scots pine (Pinus sylvestris) located on top of the 250-metre (820 ft) high Green Hall Hill overlooking the town of Llanfyllin in Powys, Wales and was visible from much of the town. The tree is thought to have seeded before 1815 and was classed as a veteran tree. The tree was 2.65 metres (8.7 ft) in girth and was noted to have been suffering from decaying wood in its crown and from hollowing of its branches.

The tree was a popular local landmark and also an attraction for hill walkers. The site was used as a scout camp site and part of the cross country course for the local school. It was also the site of one of the millennium beacons. Many traditions attached themselves to the tree with local people carving their initials on it, proposing marriage near it and having their ashes scattered there. The tree was used as the symbol of Llanfyllin Town Council.

== Felling and replacement ==
The Lonely Tree was blown over by 100-mile-per-hour (160 km/h) winds during a storm in February 2014. In an attempt to save the tree, locals brought between 30 and 60 tonnes of soil up the hill, using equipment donated by local companies, to place over its roots to prevent them drying out. There were hopes that the tree would regrow from the rootstock. Hundreds of people visited the site after the storm to pay their respects to the tree. Donations of several hundred pounds were received from Welsh expatriates towards the care of the tree. Llanfyllin town mayor Ann Williams said at the time: "The Lonely Tree is such a strong symbol of how much a community can stick together and keep something alive."

The tree received significant attention after it fell. It was voted "Wales's third favourite special place" in 2014 and in October of that year was entered into the Welsh Tree of the Year competition. The tree won the competition, and as a result, was entered into the European Tree of the Year competition in 2015, finishing tenth with 1,548 votes.

Planning for a replacement of the tree by the town council began in April 2015 and discussions were held about installing a memorial plaque if it did not recover. In June it was confirmed that the tree had died—its remains were left in situ and seeds were taken from it in the hope of growing a new tree. By December of that year seventeen saplings had been planted in a new fenced enclosure nearby with the hope that at least one would survive to become as iconic as the Lonely Tree. One sapling was a descendant of the original tree, one was from seeds collected locally and the remainder were donated by a plant nursery.
