= Nellie's Tree =

European beech trees in West Yorkshire, England

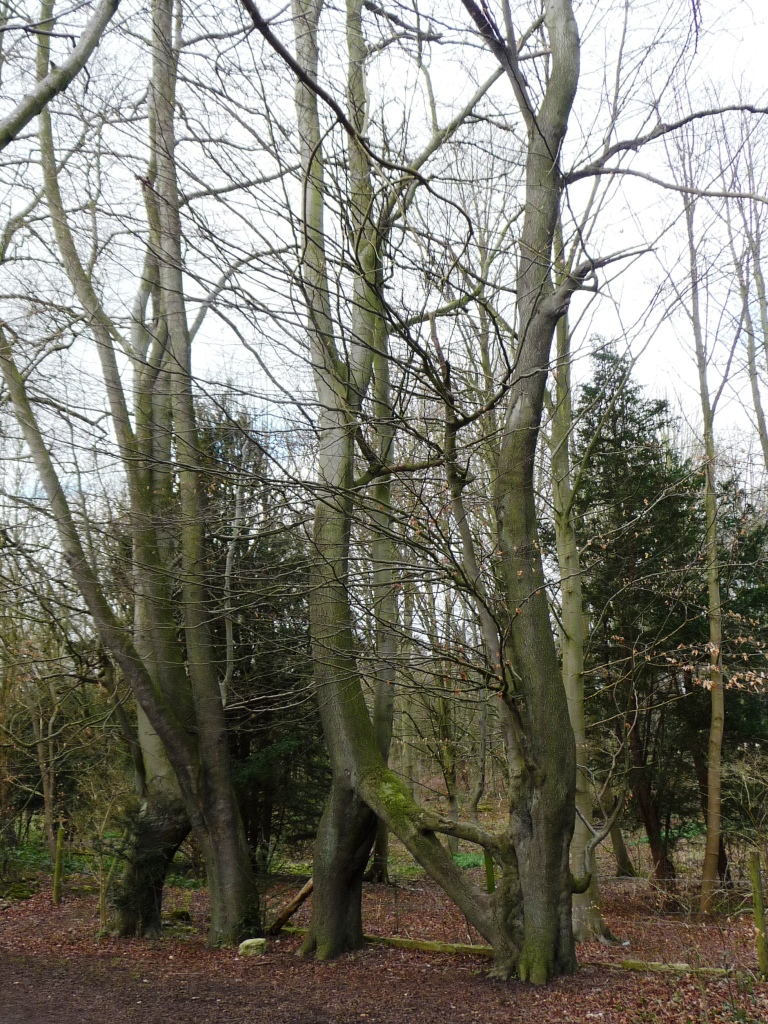
- Nellie's Tree in 2015
- Interactive map of Nellie's Tree
- Species: European beech (Fagus sylvatica)
- Location: Near Aberford, West Yorkshire, United Kingdom
- Coordinates: 53.8193°N 1.3572°W
- Date seeded: Circa 1920

Nellie's Tree (also known as the Love Tree) near Aberford, West Yorkshire is a group of three beech trees that have been grafted together in the shape of a letter "N". This arrangement of the trees is a result of a local man trying to impress his girlfriend Nellie around 1920. It has since become locally famous and is the site of numerous marriage proposals. The trees won the 2018 English and British Tree of the Year awards and came ninth in the 2019 European Tree of the Year awards.

== History ==
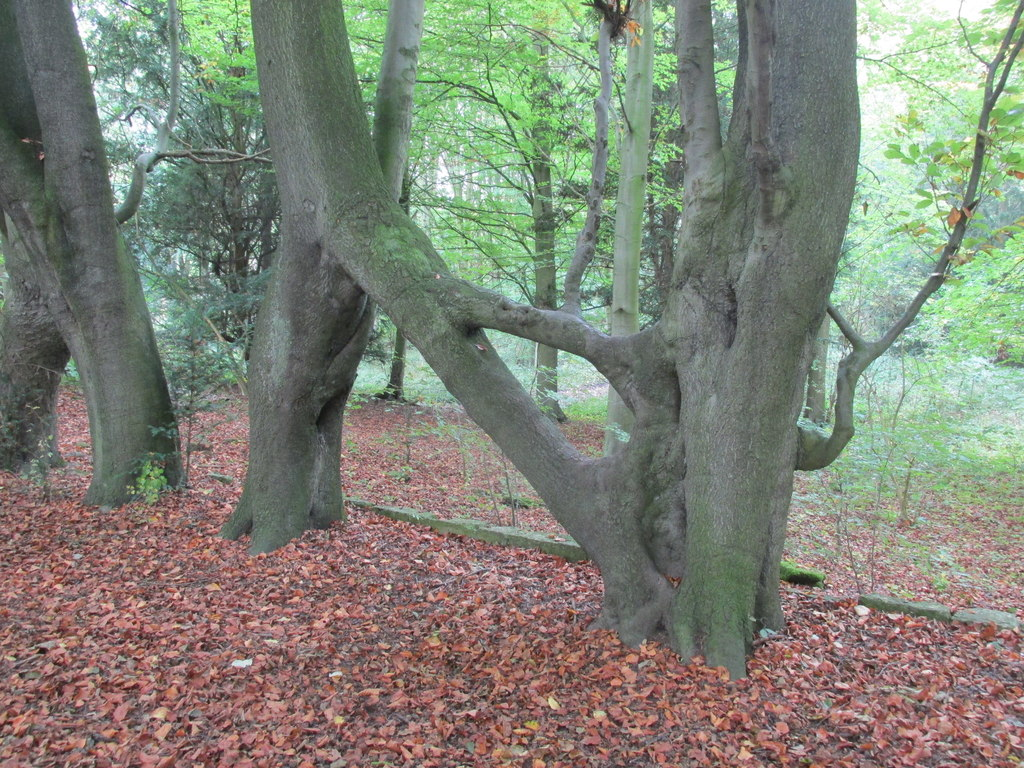
Detail of the "N" for Nellie

Though referred to as "the tree" in the singular form it is actually three separate beech trees that have been grafted together. Around 1920 a young miner and keen amateur gardener, Vic Stead, resided in Garforth. He regularly made the trip to Aberford by foot along the "Fly-line", a disused colliery railway, to see his girlfriend Nellie who worked there as a dairy maid. Near to Aberford Stead found three beech saplings growing in a row and grafted the central tree onto the two adjacent ones in a diagonal fashion to form the shape of the capital letter "N". This was intended as a gesture of his love for Nellie and as a means of impressing her. It was apparently successful in this regard as the couple later married.

The tree is known as the "Love Tree" locally and has become a popular site for marriage proposals. Writer Richard Mabey has described it as "one of the most touching twentieth-century landmark trees" in his 1996 work Flora Britannica and The Woodland Trust have called it a "northern gem". Nellie's Tree has become the symbol of the Save Parlington Action Group, a local campaign against development of the woodland.

== Tree of the Year ==
Vic and Nellie have both since died but their grandson nominated the tree into the Woodland Trust's Tree of the Year competition in 2018. He had become aware of the tree during walks in the woods with his grandparents who pointed it out and told the story behind it. The tree was selected by a panel of experts to be represented on the 10-strong shortlist put to the public vote. The tree won the English round of the competition, garnering 2,351 votes - the most of any tree in the four national competitions – and received a £1000 tree care grant from the People's Postcode Lottery. As a result of winning the English competition the tree was put forwards with the other national winners into the British competition, run in conjunction with the BBC's The One Show. The tree won the vote and was named British Tree of the Year. The tree came ninth in the 2019 European Tree of the Year awards.
