= Brimmon Oak =

Pedunculate oak tree near Newtown, Powys, Wales

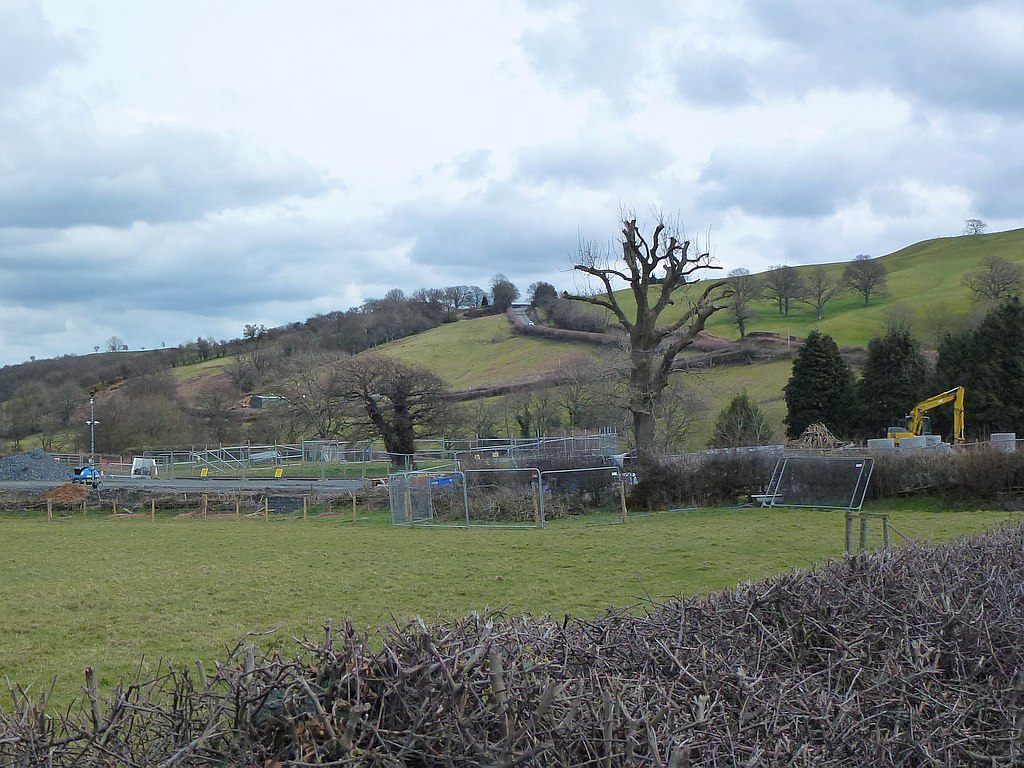
- Interactive map of Brimmon Oak
- Species: English oak (Quercus robur)
- Location: Newtown, Powys, Wales
- Coordinates: 52°30′45″N 3°17′34″W
- Date seeded: circa 1500

The Brimmon Oak is a veteran tree in Newtown, Powys, Wales. A pedunculate oak (sometimes called "English oak"), it is thought to be around 500 years old and has been on land farmed by the same family since the 1600s. The tree was scheduled to be felled as part of the construction of the A483 Newtown Bypass in 2015 but was saved as the result of a petition. The tree was named both Welsh and British Tree of the Year for 2016 and was runner up in the European Tree of the Year awards of 2017.

== History ==
The Brimmon Oak is thought to be more than 500 years old. The tree has been pollarded for timber in the past and has a girth of over 6 metres (20 ft). The land the tree stands on has been owned by the same family of farmers for generations – the current owner claims his family has farmed the field around the tree since the 1600s, and a 1901 photograph shows a wedding party sheltering beneath the tree's canopy. It has been described as one of the most significant natural monuments of Montgomeryshire, the historic county in which it stands.

The tree was scheduled to be felled as part of the construction of the A483 Newtown Bypass in 2015. The farmer of the land on which it stands organised a successful 5,000-signature petition to the Welsh Assembly calling for its preservation. The route of the bypass was altered by just over 49 ft. (15m) to protect the area around it. The campaign sought further assurances from the contractors, as they were concerned that the works specified within the area would damage the tree's roots. A further petition was launched in May 2018 to name the soon-to-be opened bypass as the "Newtown Brimmon Oak Bypass" in honour of the tree.

== Tree of the Year awards ==
In 2016 the tree won the Welsh Tree of the Year awards and in December of that year was selected by judges as the United Kingdom's tree of the year beating the winners of the national awards for England, Scotland and Northern Ireland. The prize was a £1,000 care grant and entry into the European Tree of the Year awards. In March 2017 it was announced that the tree had finished second in the European awards, determined by popular vote. The tree was second to the Józef Oak in Poland and received 16,200 votes. The result was the best placed finish for a British tree in the award's history.

== See also ==
- List of individual trees
