= Last Ent of Affric =

Ancient elm in the Scottish Highlands

The Last Ent of Affric
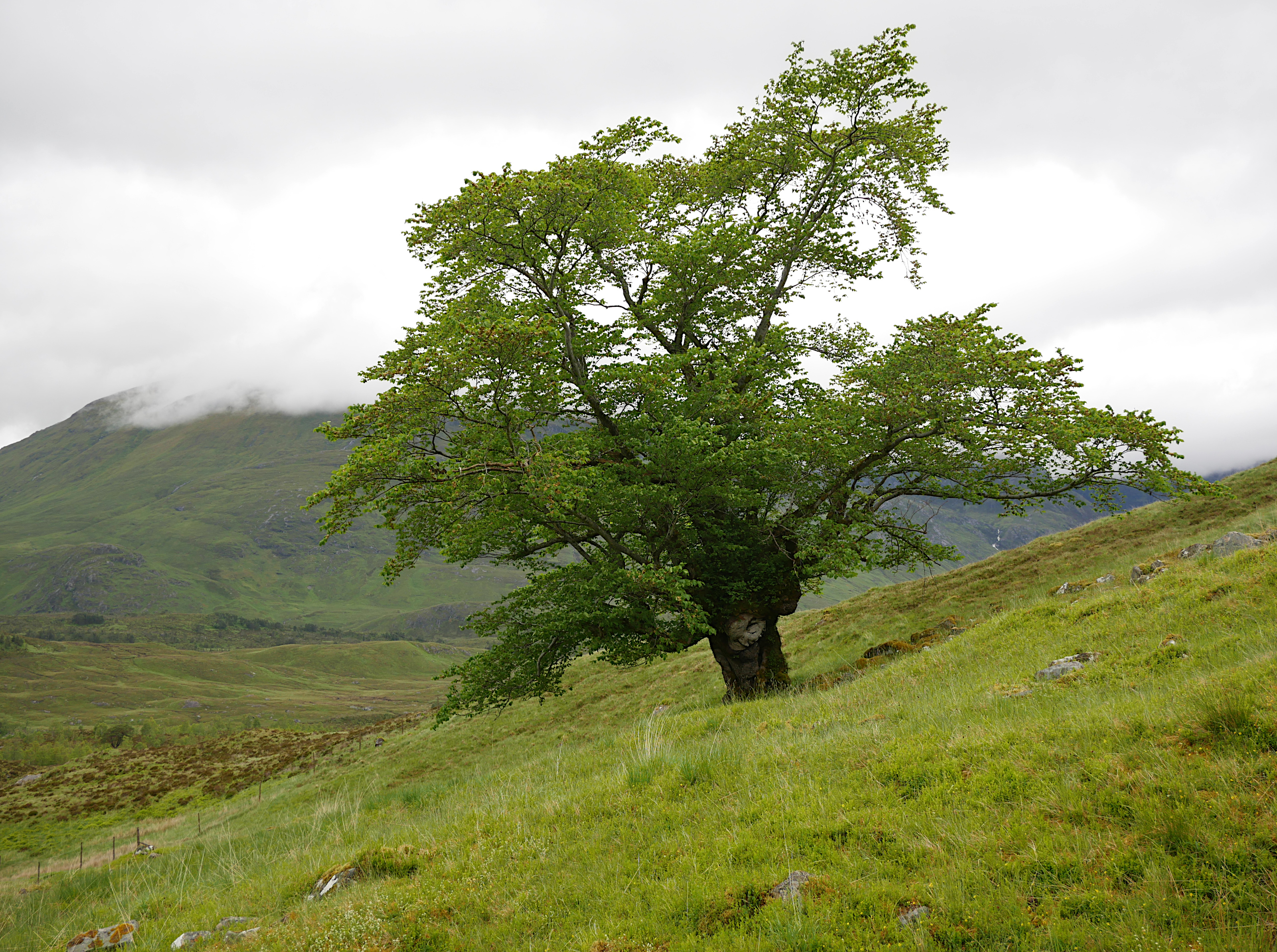
- The tree on the slopes of Gleann nan Cìche

- Location within Highland
- Species: Wych elm (Ulmus glabra)
- Location: Glean nan Cìche, Glen Affric near Cannich in the Scottish Highlands
- Coordinates: 57°13′17″N 5°06′23″W
- Girth: 3.8m
- Website: Woodland Trust - Ancient Tree Inventory

The Last Ent of Affric is an ancient elm in the Scottish Highlands, designated a Tree of National Special Interest (TNSI) by the Woodland Trust and named Scotland's Tree of the Year in 2019. It is probably the last surviving tree of an ancient forest, and by virtue of its isolation has remained safe from Dutch elm disease.

== History and description ==
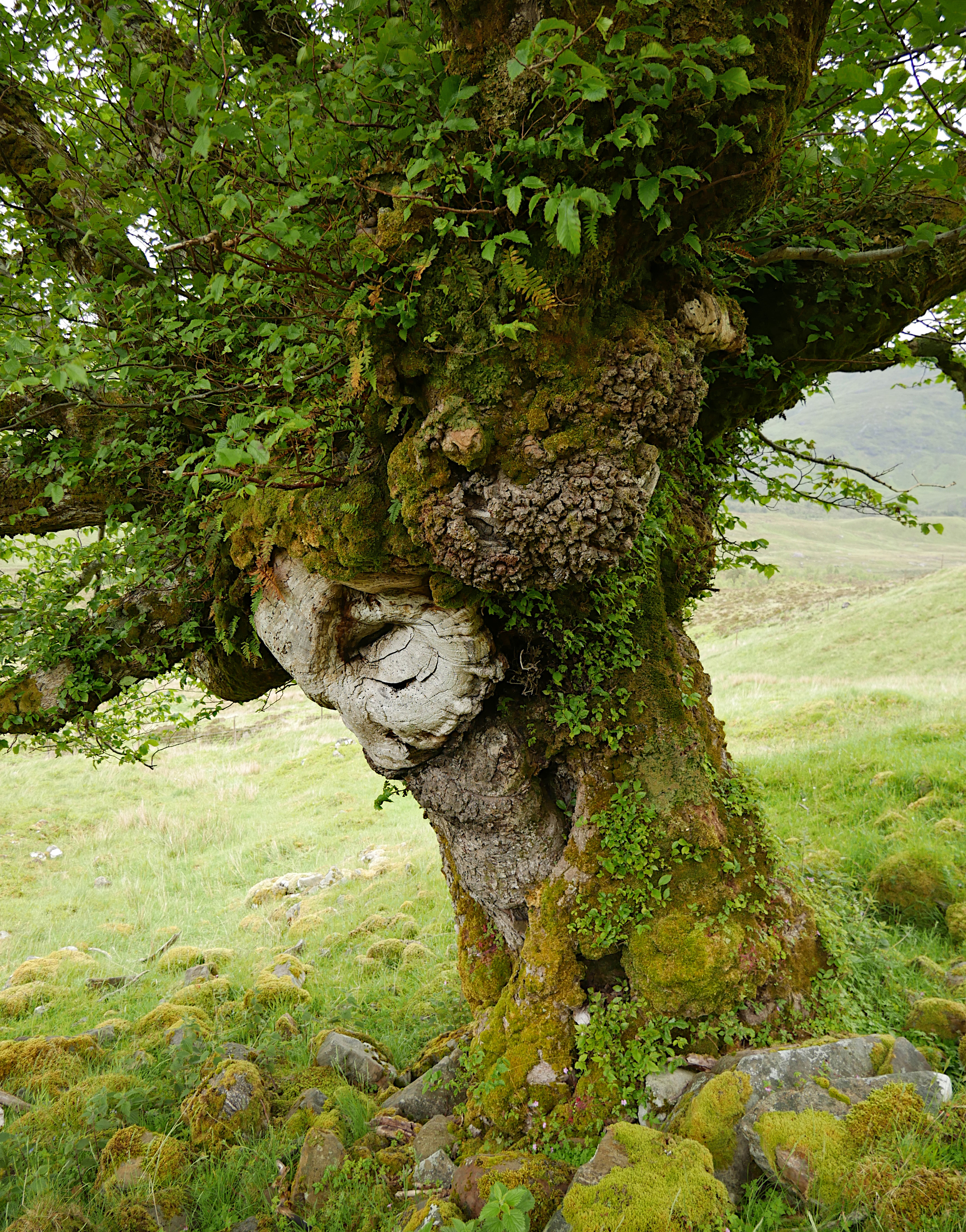
A close view of the trunk

The 'Last Ent of Affric' is a centuries-old Wych elm (Ulmus glabra), named in reference to the tree-creatures of J.R.R. Tolkien's Lord of the Rings. Giles Brockman of Forestry and Land Scotland (FLS), who nominated the tree for the Tree of the Year Award 2019, said:

Given its location, its isolation - and its peculiar 'face' - it's very easy to imagine it as one of Tolkien's Ents standing sentinel over the rebirth of a new native woodland in Affric.

It has a girth of 3.80m at a height of 1.50m. It is located in Gleann na Cìche, a side spur off Glen Affric in the Highlands of Scotland. The Last Ent's exact age is uncertain, but its diameter suggests it is many centuries old. Given its unusual location, and isolation, it is supposed to be the single surviving tree of ancient forest. Brockman said:

The Last Ent is growing on the rocky outflow of a mountain stream, not a place where you would choose to plant a tree, there being little soil under the moss that covers the rocks. So this must be a survivor of a forest long departed, a sentinel watching over the new native woodland growing on the slopes below.

Discovery of owl pellets among the roots of the tree suggests that it is home to a roost of owls.

== Tree of the Year ==
In 2019, The Last Ent of Affric was named as Scotland's Tree of the Year, following nomination by Giles Brockman of Forestry and Land Scotland (FLS). Brockman had launched a campaign to recognise the elm, which he described as "a hidden mystery of Glen Affric." It was one of six finalists, selected from public nominations, and subsequently won an online public vote.

Following its becoming Tree of the Year, the Last Ent of Affric was adopted as a figurehead of efforts to fight Dutch elm disease. Dr. Euan Bowditch, from the Wooded Landscapes Research Group at Inverness College UHI, noted the significance of educating the public on the ongoing presence of healthy elms - and the need to protect them - in the face of the Dutch elm disease threat. He noted:

The public perception of elm is probably quite defeatist. Many people might not realise that healthy elms exist, grow and regenerate. I think it is important to emphasise that elms are not lost to our landscape.

Dutch elm disease is spread by beetles, aided by the movement of infected wood. As such, the campaign to halt its spread in Scotland and the Highlands focuses on limiting the movement of this wood, to protect remaining elms.

== See also ==
- List of individual trees
- Dutch elm disease
- Tree of the Year (United Kingdom)
- Glen Affric
