= Skipinnish Oak =

Oak tree in Achnacarry, Lochaber, Scotland

Coordinates: 56°55′54″N 4°59′12″W

The Skipinnish Oak is a large and ancient oak tree in Lochaber in the Scottish Highlands. In 2024 it won UK Tree of the Year.

It is a sessile oak (Quercus petraea), thought to be at least 400 years old. It is hidden within a Sitka spruce plantation, on the Achnacarry estate, near Loch Lochy. It is named after the ceilidh band Skipinnish, who were playing at a Native Woodland Discussion Group gathering at Fort William in 2009. The day after the gig, the band members guided woodland experts to the tree.
