= Ding Dong tree =

The Ding Dong Tree
- Species: Copper beech (Fagus sylvatica f. purpurea)
- Location: Prestonpans, Scotland
- Coordinates: 55.9540°N 2.9753°W
- Custodian: Prestonpans Primary School

The Ding Dong tree is a Copper beech tree (Fagus sylvatica f. purpurea) in Prestonpans, Scotland, named Scotland's Tree of the Year in 2016. It achieved 8th place in the European Tree of the Year Award the following year. Although young compared to other trees in these annual competitions, the Ding Dong Tree was recognised as having become 'central to the life and identity of the school' on whose grounds it sits, and a prominent example of 'what individual trees can mean to people'.

== History and description ==
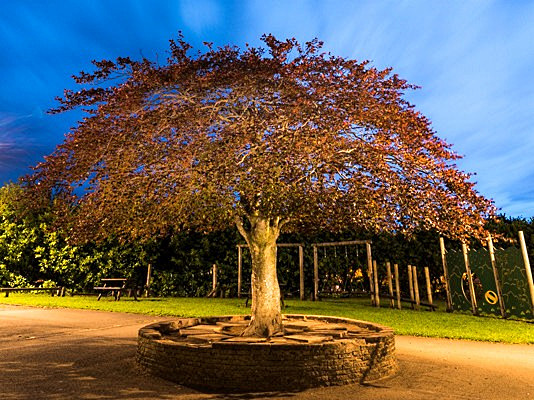
The Ding Dong tree in Prestonpans

The Ding Dong tree is a copper beech, approximately 30 years old. It is located in the grounds of Prestonpans Primary School, where it gained its nickname from a game played by children at the school. The name arose from a game of 'tig' (or tag), in which pupils of the school race to touch the tree's trunk, shouting 'Ding Dong' when they succeed. The tree's canopy is used by the school as a kind of 'outdoor classroom', and it is also acknowledged for its calming influence on children with complex emotional needs. The Ding Dong tree has been the focus of many art and science projects. Inside the school, pictures of the tree form a calendar display throughout the year, alongside commemorations of pupils' achievements.

In 2016, the Ding Dong tree was named Scotland's Tree of the Year, in an annual competition run by the Woodland Trust. The win was announced at a reception in the Scottish Parliament and on television the next month. The prize included up to £1000 towards maintenance of the tree. The following year, the Ding Dong tree won 6,327 votes in the European Tree of the Year competition, obtaining 8th place among 16 contenders from across Europe.

== Legacy ==
In 2018, the East Lothian Courier reported that the Ding Dong tree was 'heading for retirement.' Citing concerns for the 'long-term future of the copper beech', the decision was made to plant a sapling to ultimately act as a successor, named "son of Ding Dong". Martin Whitfield, an MP and former teacher at the Prestonpans school, said:

It will be sad for the school and pupils, past and present, when the Ding Dong tree is replaced. It was known to many generations of local children, as evidenced by the passing on of ding dong, the game invented so long ago. The tree also helped put the whole of Prestonpans in the spotlight a couple of years ago when it was named Scottish Tree of the Year. I’m sure the new tree will go on to give the same enjoyment to future generations of pupils.

== See also ==
- Tree of the Year (United Kingdom)
