= Niel Gow's Oak =

Oak tree in Perth and Kinross, Scotland

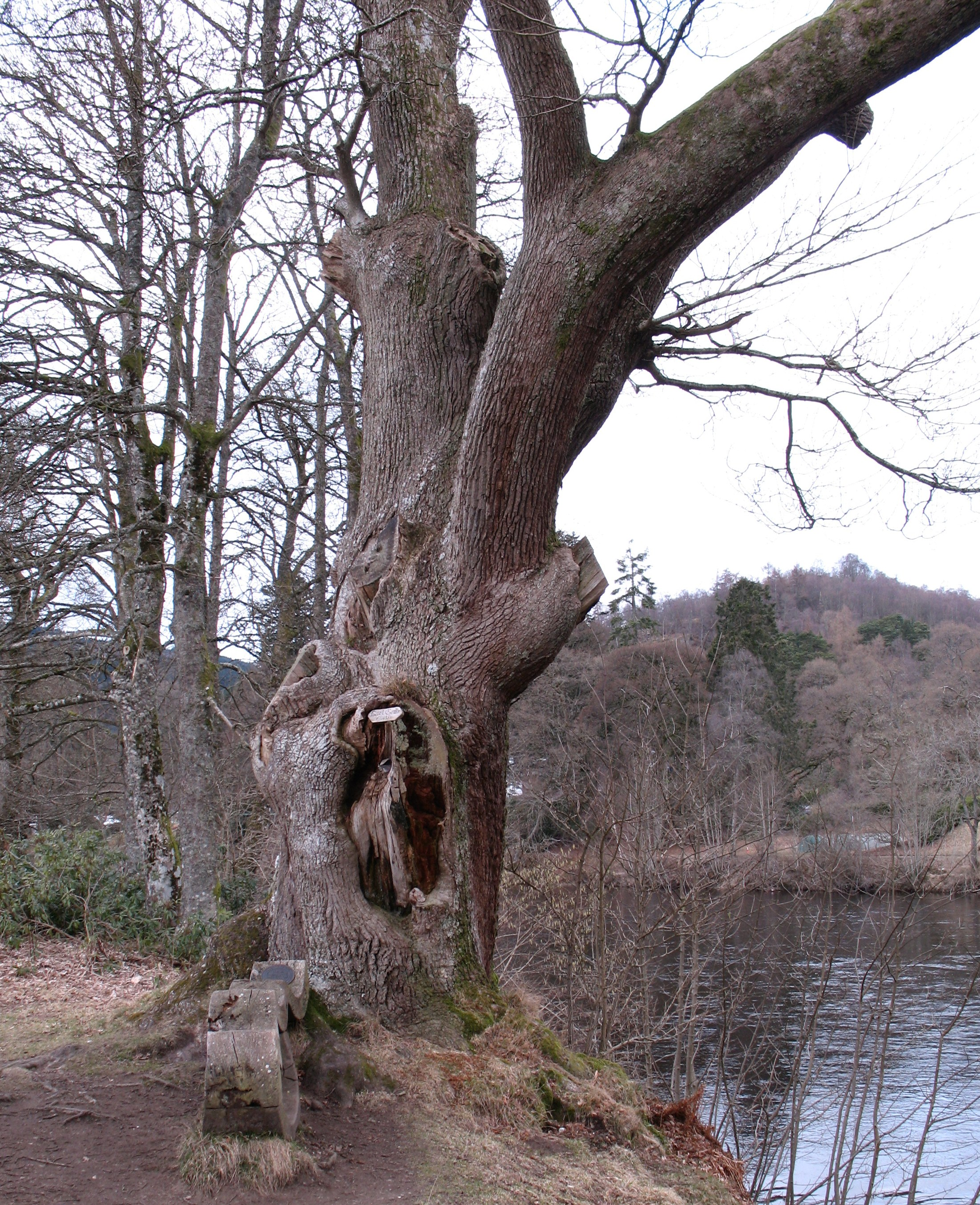
- View of the tree, bench and River Tay in 2010
- Interactive map of Niel Gow's Oak
- Species: Sessile oak (Quercus petraea)
- Location: near Dunkeld and Birnam, Perth and Kinross, Scotland
- Coordinates: 56.5632°N 3.6072°W
- Date seeded: circa 1700
- Custodian: Forestry Commission

Niel Gow's Oak is a 300-year-old tree near Dunkeld and Birnam, Perth and Kinross, Scotland. It is closely associated with the Scottish fiddler and composer Niel Gow, who lived in nearby Inver. Gow is said to have composed many of his most famous tunes whilst sitting beneath the oak. The connection is commemorated by a plaque and engraved bench. The tree has been entered into the Scottish and European Tree of the Year competitions. The tree was badly damaged by storms in 2011 and 2012.

== Description ==
Niel Gow's Oak is a sessile oak (Quercus petraea) located near to the towns of Dunkeld and Birnam, Scotland, which is around 300 years old. It lies within the Craigvinean Forest on the south bank of the River Tay. It accessible by the public and lies on the Inver Walk public footpath, part of the Dunkeld Path Network. It lies between the path and the riverbank in a field used to graze sheep and horses.

== Niel Gow connection ==
Niel Gow (1727–1807) was a Scottish fiddler who lived in nearby Inver and composed many Scottish country dance tunes. The oak has been linked to Gow since at least 1855 when it featured in an Illustrated London News article. The connection was also made in an 1881 journal article. Gow is said to have sat beneath the tree to compose many of his most famous tunes. The music could be heard from the far bank of the Tay by John Murray, 4th Duke of Atholl who was said to have been so impressed that he paid Gow a retainer to play at family functions.

In recognition of the connection the Forestry Commission, which owns the tree and the land it stands on, erected a bench under the tree. It was engraved with the words "sit beneath the fiddle tree, with the ghost of Niel Gow next to me" – lyrics taken from the song "Niel Gow's Apprentice" by Scottish singer-songwriter Michael Marra.

== Recent events ==
The tree was entered into the European Tree of the Year awards in 2014, becoming the first Scottish entry into the competition. The tree came in 7th place (out of 10) with 1,740 votes. It also made the six-strong shortlist for Scotland's Tree of the year 2016. The tree was badly damaged by a storm in December 2011 and again in 2012 when falling branches destroyed the carved bench commemorating Gow. A replacement bench was unveiled by Michael Marra's widow on 25 March 2013.

== Gallery ==
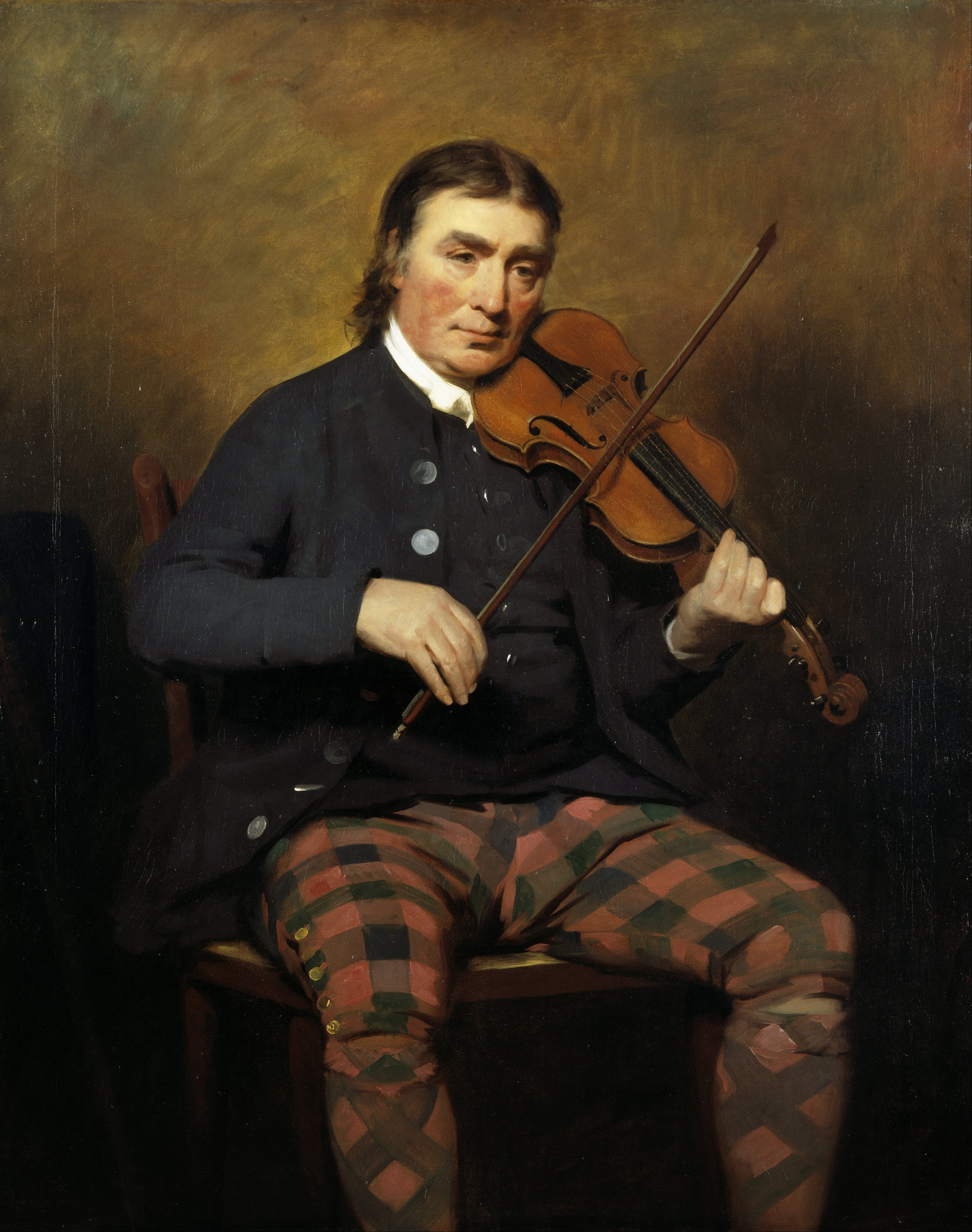
Niel Gow

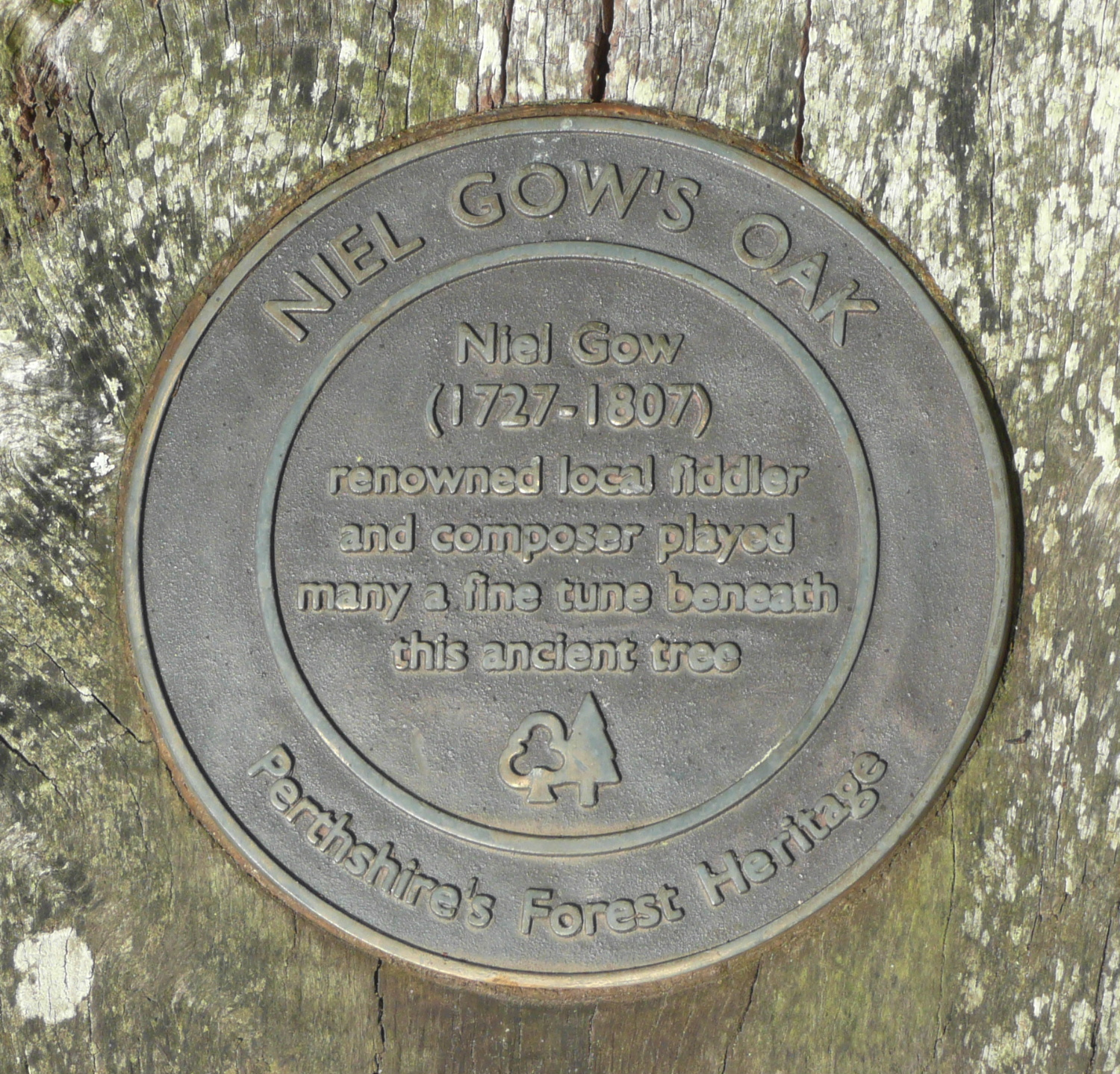
Commemorative plaque at the site

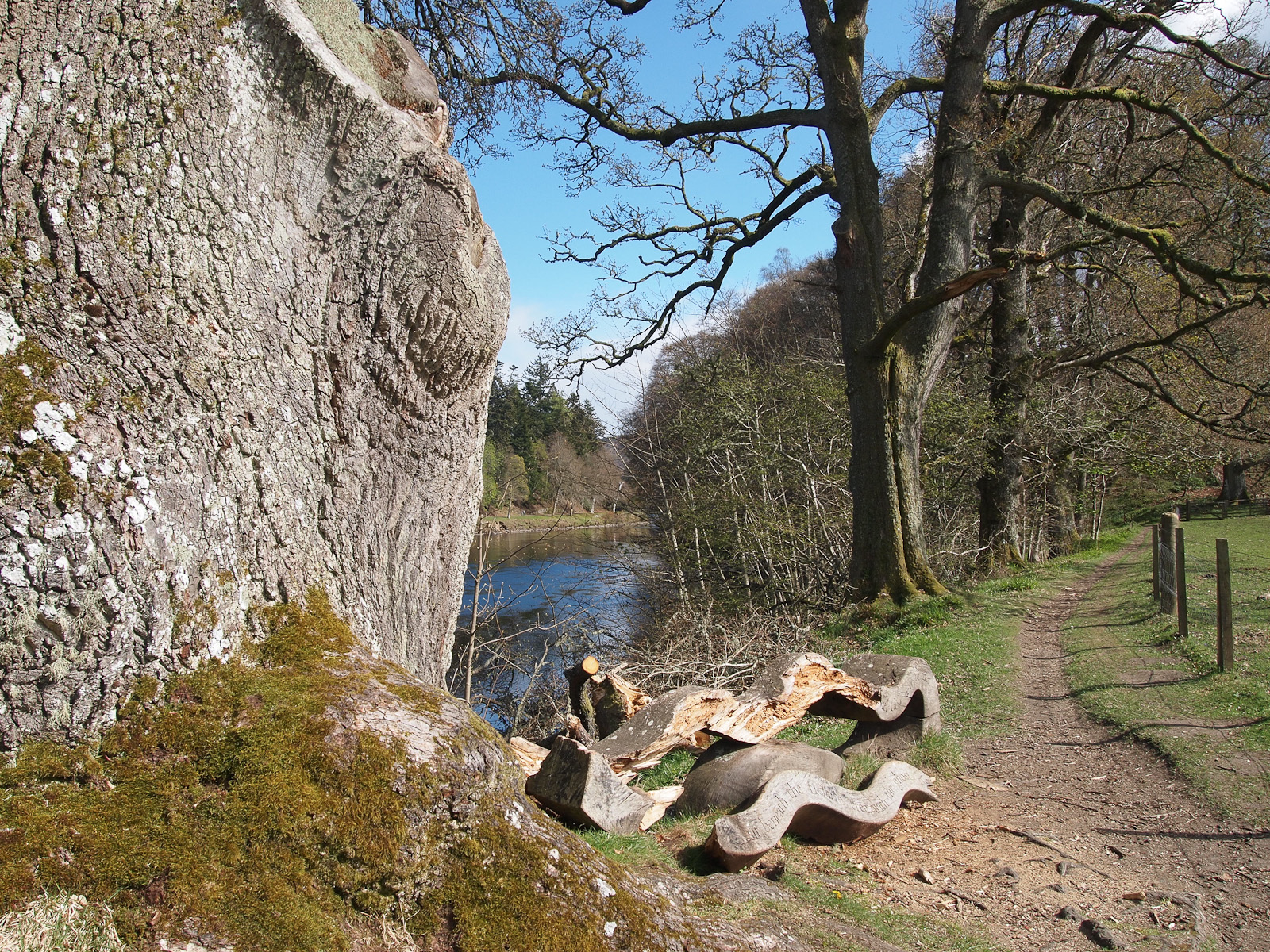
The original Gow bench as destroyed by falling branches in 2012

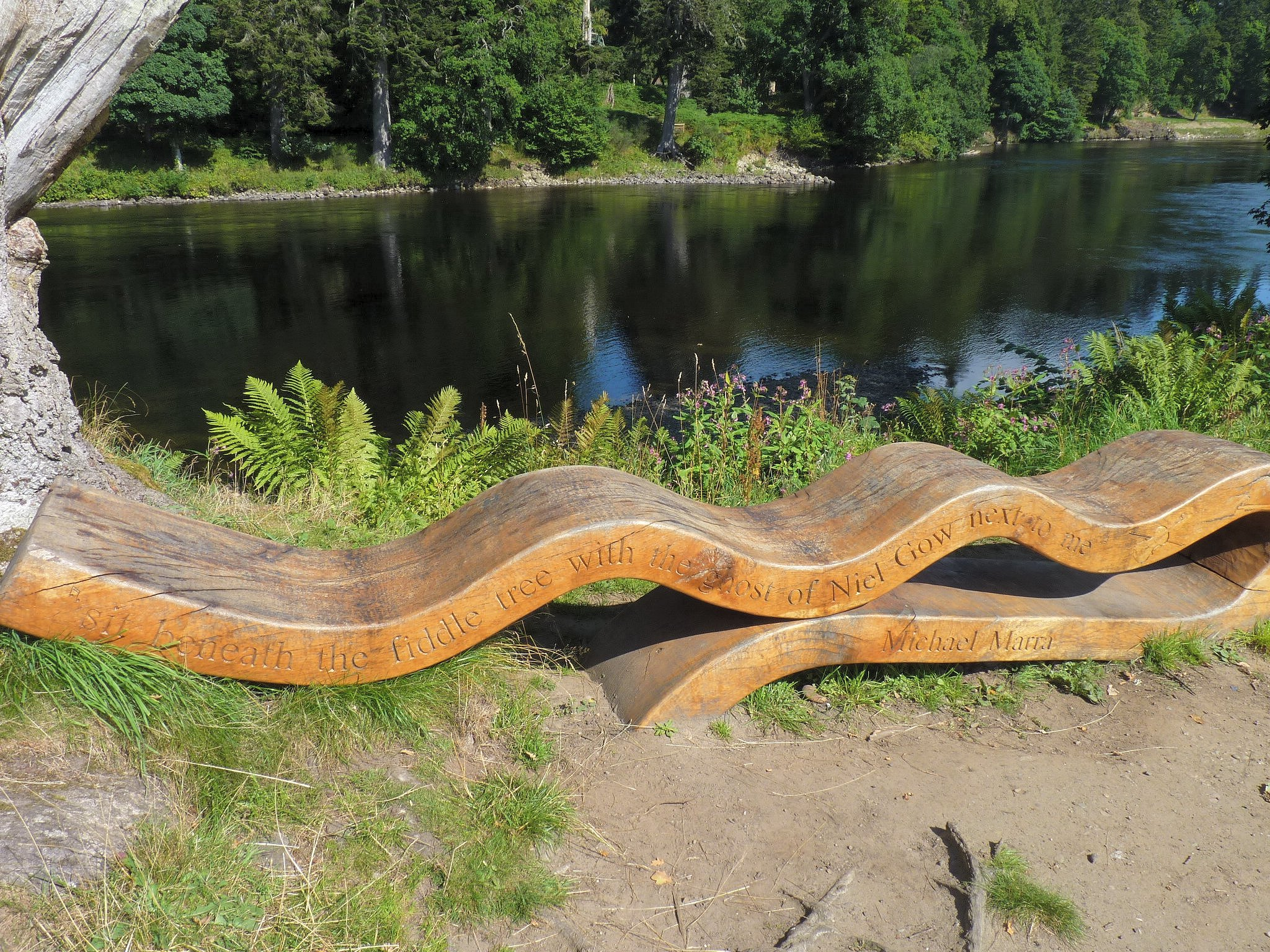
The 2013 memorial bench
