= Oak at the Gate of the Dead =

Ancient oak tree in Wales

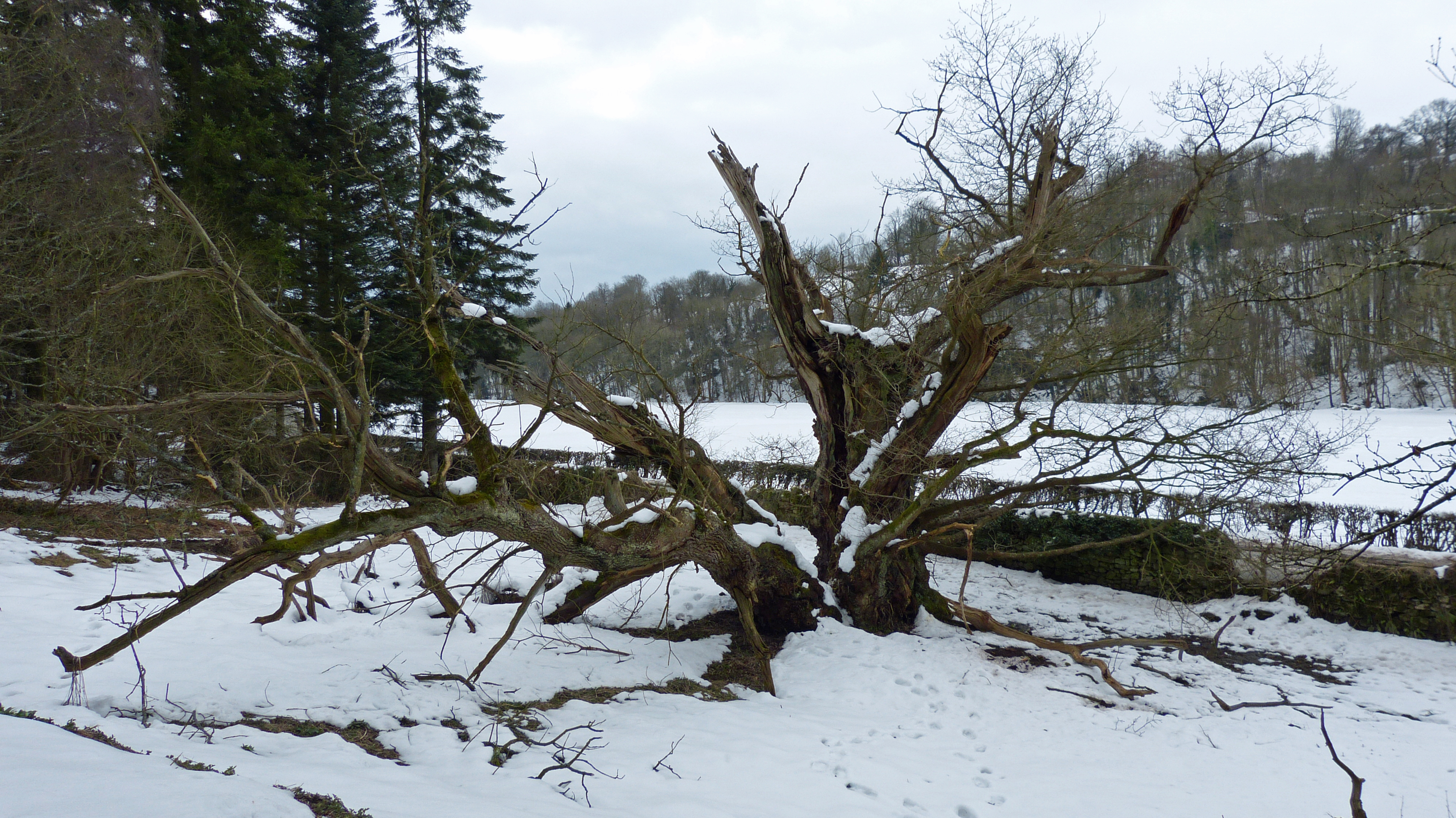
- The tree in April 2013
- Native name: Derwen Adwy'r Meirwon (Welsh)
- Species: English oak (Quercus robur)
- Location: Ceiriog Valley, near Chirk, Wales
- Coordinates: 52°55′53.23″N 3°5′43.24″W
- Date seeded: circa 800-1000 AD
- Website: Facebook page

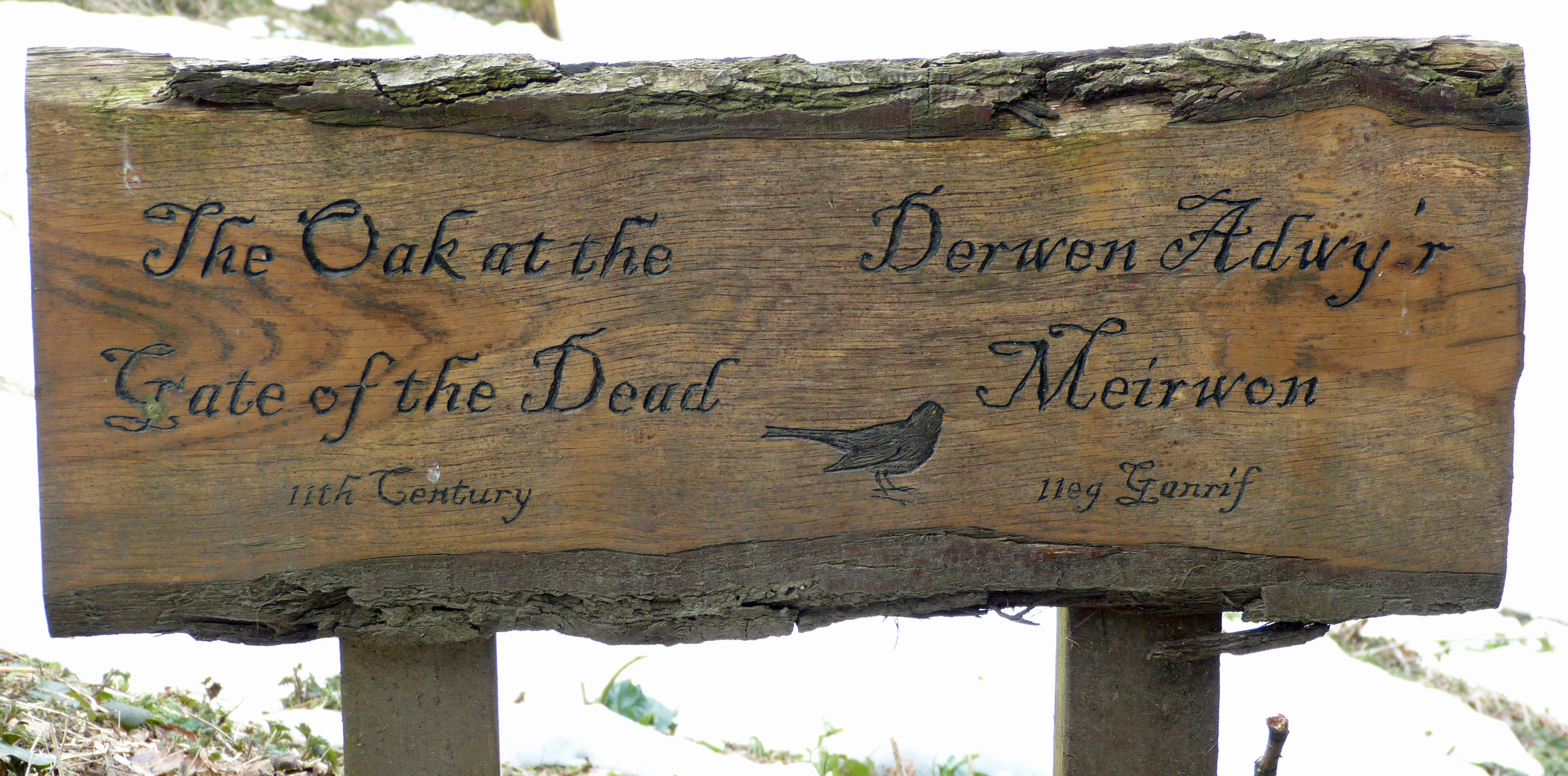
The plaque naming the tree

The Oak at the Gate of the Dead (Welsh: Derwen Adwy'r Meirwon), or Crogen Oak is a veteran tree in Wrexham County Borough, Wales. Located near the 8th-century Offa's Dyke, the tree is thought to be more than 1,000 years old. The tree is located near the site of the 1165 Battle of Crogen, and is named for a supposed burial site of battle dead nearby.

== Location ==
The oak, a Quercus robur, is situated near Wrexham in modern-day Wales. It lies on Offa's Dyke Path which runs near to Offa's Dyke, a circa 8th-century Anglo-Saxon border earthwork between Mercia and the Welsh Kingdoms. It is located around 300 metres (980 ft) from Chirk Castle, at the entrance to the Ceiriog Valley and next to a public road (the B4500).

== History ==
The oak is estimated to be more than 1,000 years old and it has been associated with the reign of King Ecgberht of Wessex (802–839). If the estimated age is correct, the oak was standing in 1165 when the Battle of Crogen was fought at the location and has therefore been described as the "only living witness to this battle". A Welsh army under Owain Gwynedd inflicted a defeat upon the English king Henry II and forced him to retreat. The battle's dead were said to have been buried in the ditch of the dyke at that point: in the 19th century this was known as Adwy'r Beddau, the pass, or gap, of the graves, with some of the graves still being visible as late as 1697 according to one account. Two or three parcels of land on either side of the dyke were also known as Tir y Beddau, land of the graves, although one early 19th century account suggested that the place was also known as Adwy'r Bedwen, the gap of the birch tree. The tree has in recent years been promoted as a symbol of the Battle of Crogen, under the name "Oak at the Gate of the Dead", and in March 2009 a plaque was unveiled honouring this link. In cold weather in February 2010 the tree split into two and was subsequently afforded the protection of a tree preservation order by Wrexham County Borough Council.

The oak is a well-known and valued local landmark and was one of the first trees in the world to have its own Facebook page. Since being identified and named in 2007 by Woodland Trust recorder Rob McBride it has been featured in such programmes as Countryfile, BBC Midlands news, BBC Wales TV, BBC Radio Wales, and BBC Radio Shropshire, and its story was told in a film made by Take 27 Ltd and shown at the Wrexham Histories Festival on 4 February 2011. The Woodland Trust entered the tree into the European Tree of the Year awards in 2014, the first time a Welsh tree had been nominated.

== See also ==
- List of individual trees
