= Bendy Tree =

Elm tree in Newcastle, Northern Ireland

Coordinates: 54°12′31.0″N 5°53′28.4″W

The Bendy Tree is a wych elm tree on The Promenade in Newcastle, County Down, in Northern Ireland. It won the 2026 Tree of the Year competition.

The 'Bendy Tree' is located on The Promenade in Newcastle, County Down, in Northern Ireland. It has been growing almost horizontally due to its coastal setting on the seafront in Newcastle. It was planted along with many others in the mid-19th century, possibly part of the grounds of a hotel, but is the sole survivor. The original trees were all removed in the 1980s for redevelopment. It has not been affected by Dutch elm disease. It is a popular meeting place and subject of local photography.

== 2026 UK Tree of the Year ==
The Bendy Tree was declared the winner of the United Kingdom Tree of the Year competition in October 2026 run by the Woodland Trust. The theme of the 2026 competition was 'Against All Odds' which celebrated trees that had overcome adverse surroundings or circumstances, and had "gone the extra mile, surviving an array of challenges and still standing strong against the odds". This was the first time that a tree from Northern Ireland had won the UK Tree of the Year. It received 31% of the vote. The Woodland Trust described the Bendy Tree as "gravity-defying...much-loved...and a real fighter".
