= Allerton Oak =

Tree in Liverpool, England

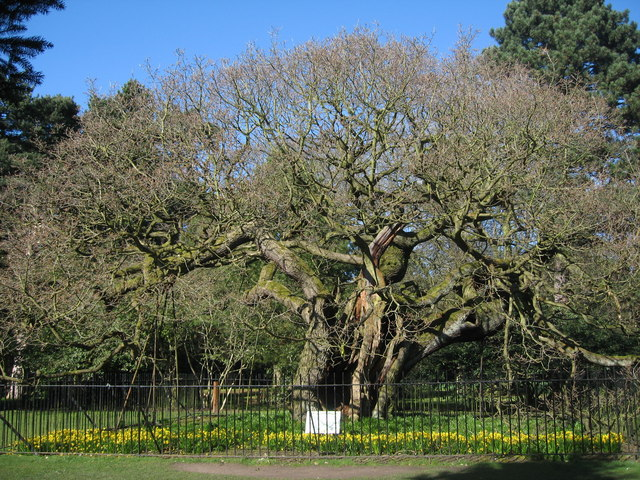
- The Allerton Oak in March 2009
- Interactive map of Allerton Oak
- Species: Irish oak (Quercus petraea)
- Location: Calderstones Park; Liverpool, England
- Coordinates: 53.3826°N 2.8928°W
- Date seeded: Circa 1000 AD

The Allerton Oak is an Irish oak tree in Calderstones Park in Liverpool, England. It is thought to be around 1,000 years old and is described as the oldest oak in North West England. It is reputed to have been the setting for a medieval hundred court and said to have been damaged in an 1864 gunpowder explosion. The tree won the 2019 English Tree of the Year competition and had been entered into the 2020 European Tree of the Year competition.

== History ==
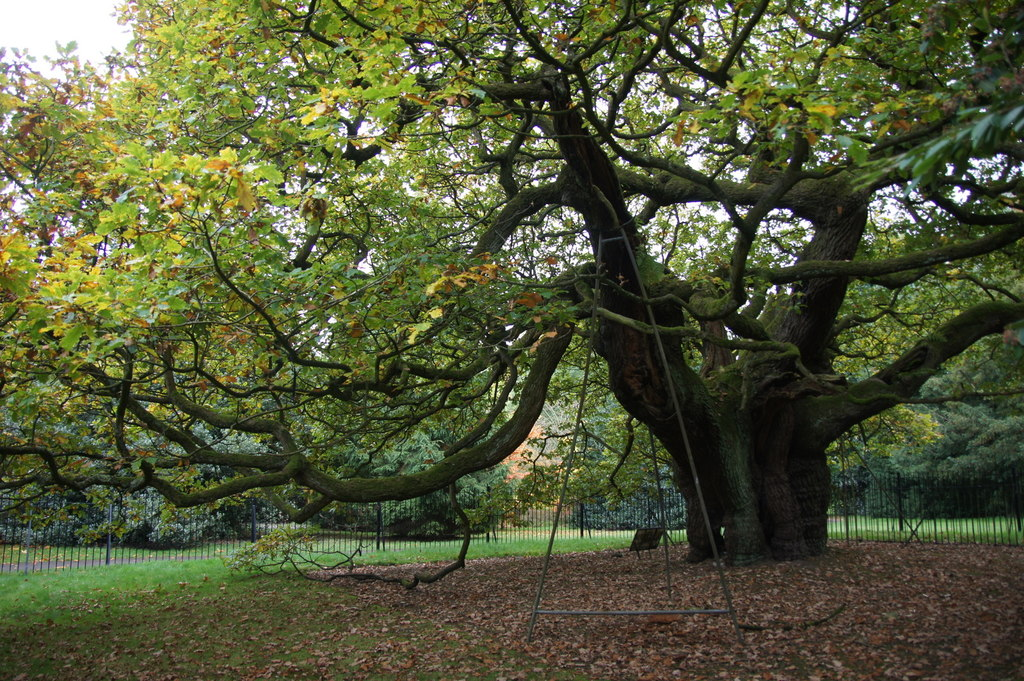
One of the tree's metal supports

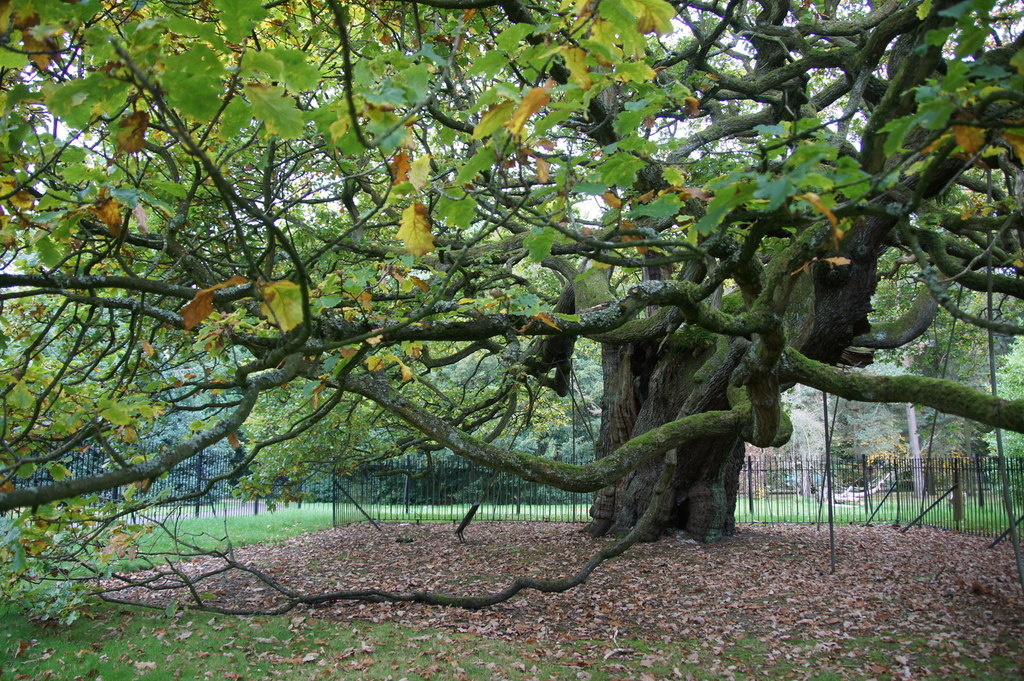
The Allerton Oak in October 2015

The Allerton Oak is around 1,000 years old and is thought to pre-date the 1066 Norman Invasion. The tree has a girth of 5.5 metres (18 ft) and is thought to be in good health, producing some 100,000 acorns each year.

The Allerton Oak is said to have been the site of a medieval hundred court that sat beneath its branches, though some believe that the nearby neolithic burial monument at Calderstones (demolished in the Victorian era) is the more likely site for the court. The tree is also reputed to have been damaged in 1864 when the merchant ship Lottie Sleigh, carrying 11 tonnes of gunpowder, exploded on the River Mersey, some 3 miles (4.8 km) away. The detonation blew out the windows of the nearby Calderstones Manor and is said to have caused a large crack in the trunk of the tree which has weakened it structurally.

The tree and the land it stands on was owned by Henry and Charles MacIver from 1875 until 1902 when they gave it to the Liverpool Corporation to form Calderstones Park. The tree became a landmark and during the Second World War local soldiers were sent acorns and leaves from the tree as good luck tokens from friends and family; as a result seedlings of the tree are thought to have been grown across the world. A report on the tree in 1970 suggested that it would be dead by 2020 due to rot in its trunk; despite this the tree as of 2014 was said to be thriving.

In 2007, an acorn from the tree was planted as its successor and the new tree has become known as "Allerton Oak the Younger". The pair are the only two Irish oaks in the park. The branches of the Allerton Oak have been supported with metal props since 1907 and it is fenced off to protect it. As of 2019, Liverpool City Council and Mersey Forest are undertaking an £80,000 project to replace the props with a modern support system that will be adjustable to accommodate the tree's growth. The Woodland Trust described the Allerton Oak as "a spectacular example of a city tree" and valued it at £500,000 in 2019.

The Allerton Oak was entered into the Tree of the Year competition in 2019. The tree won the England category with 34% of the 11,000 votes cast and was selected from all the British national winners as the national entry into the 2020 European Tree of the Year competition. The tree won a £1,000 grant from the People's Postcode Lottery to help pay for its maintenance.

== See also ==
- List of individual trees
