= Lottie Sleigh =

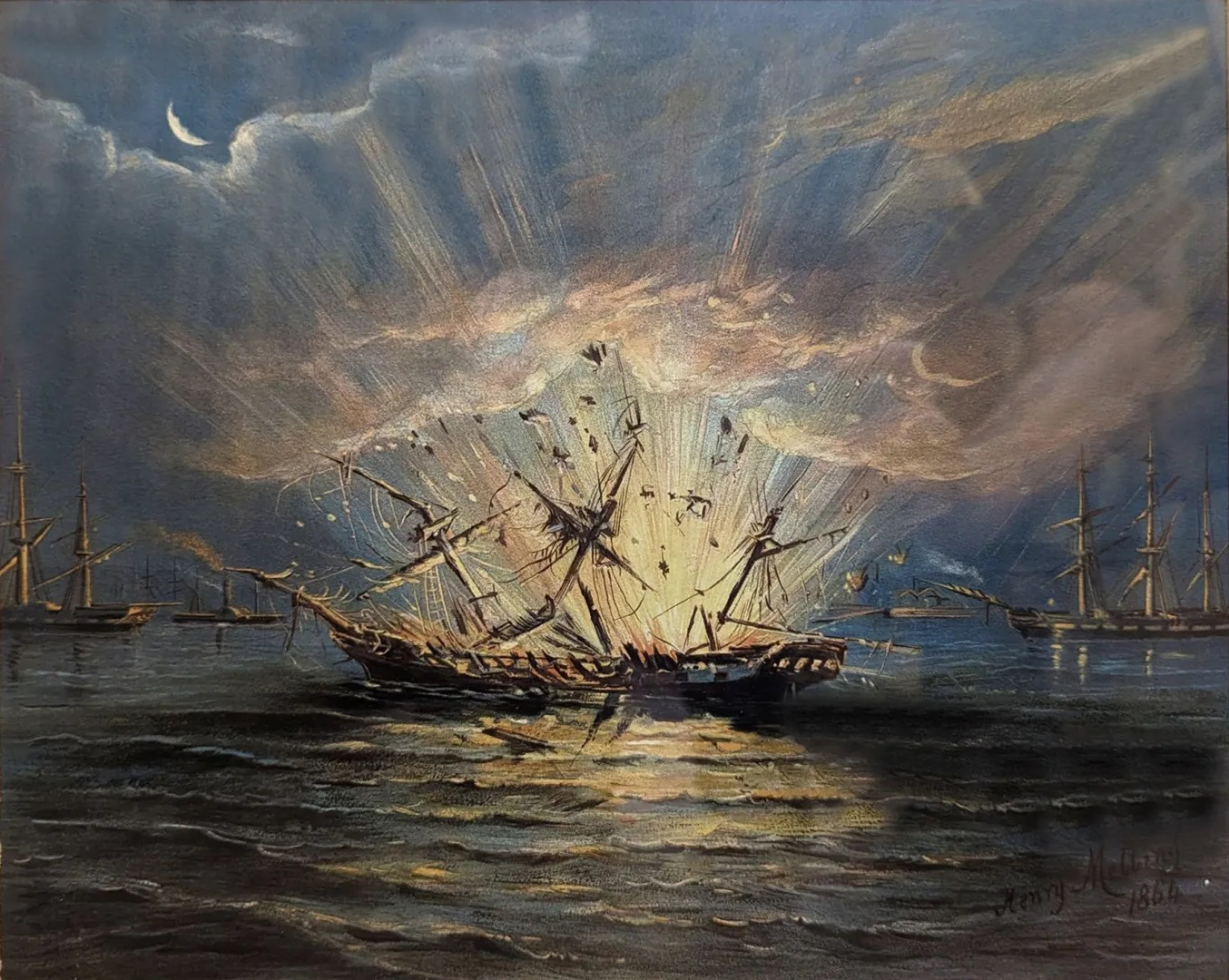
- The explosion on Lotty Sleigh by Henry Melling

History
- Name: Lottie Sleigh/Lotty Sleigh
- Owner: Mr Hatton and Mr Cookson
- Port of registry: Liverpool
- Builder: Shipyard on Prince Edward Island
- Completed: 1852
- Out of service: 15 January 1864 (following explosion)
- Fate: Sold for scrap 27 January 1864

General characteristics
- Tonnage: 700 long tons (710 t)
- Sail plan: Barque

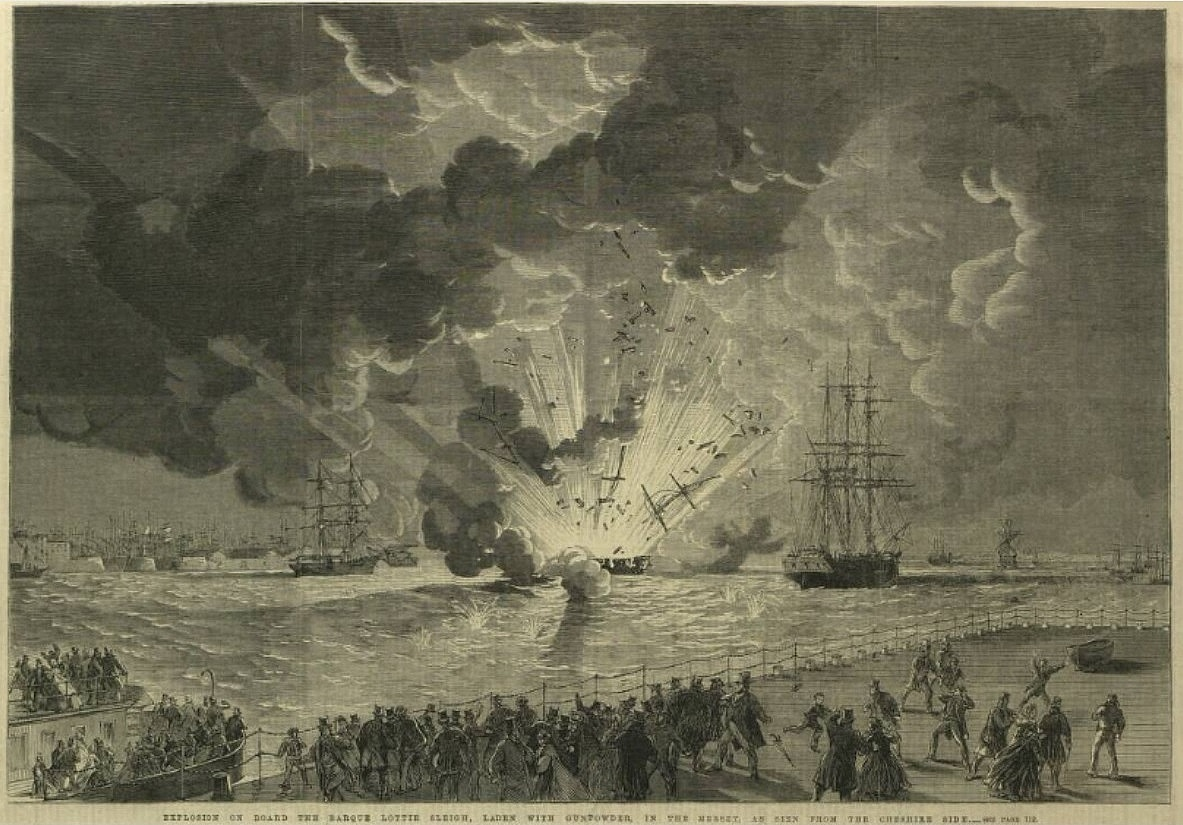
Depiction of the 1864 explosion from the Illustrated London News

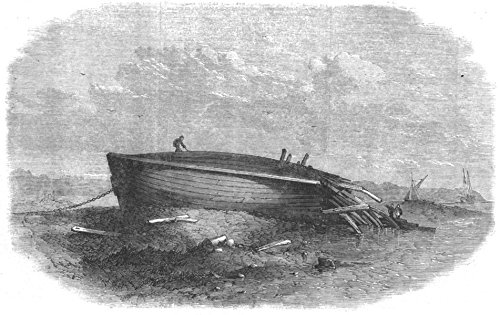
Depiction of the wreck of the vessel

The Lottie Sleigh or Lotty Sleigh (Note: The original spelling in official registration records was Lotty Sleigh and was dominant in the newspaper reports in 1864) was a sailing barque built in 1852. She was transporting 11 long tons (11 tonnes) of gunpowder on the River Mersey when she exploded on 15 January 1864. There were no deaths but the explosion caused extensive damage to Birkenhead and its effects were felt across Liverpool. The noise of the explosion could be heard from 39 miles (63 km) away. The Lottie Sleigh was severely damaged and was sold for scrap on 27 January. Discussions over insurance liability for the property damage led to a court decision that is important in insurance case law.

== Ship ==
The Lottie Sleigh was built in 1852 at Prince Edward Island (modern-day Canada) as a 700-long-ton (710 t) barque merchant ship. She was named after the wife of Colonel Sleigh, a major landowner of the island who owned the land upon which the shipyard stood. The ship's figurehead, a three-quarter length depiction of a woman with blonde hair, a white bodice and blue dress, is believed to represent Mrs Sleigh. The ship's owners were Mr Hatton and Mr Cookson who intended to use her for trading with Africa.

== Explosion ==
On 15 January 1864 the vessel was at anchor on the River Mersey near Birkenhead when a steward knocked over a can of oil whilst trimming a lamp. The fire spread quickly and the crew successfully abandoned ship onto a passing ferry.

The Lottie Sleigh's cargo of 11 long tons (11 tonnes) of gunpowder subsequently exploded. No deaths were caused but much damage was caused to Birkenhead and thousands of window panes across Liverpool were shattered. Locked doors were reported to have been blown open and most of the gas street lamps in Liverpool extinguished by the shock wave. Reportedly the trunk of the ancient Allerton Oak was cracked by the force of the blast. It is said that the noise of the explosion could be heard from 39 miles (63 km) away; indeed the authorities in Chester telegraphed Liverpool to investigate the cause of the noise. The ship's figurehead, now held in the collection of the Merseyside Maritime Museum, was recovered intact some miles away from the ship.

The wreck of the vessel was beached at New Ferry and was sold on 27 January for scrap.

== Insurance law ==
The Lottie Sleigh is a famous case in insurance law. Around 80 of the properties damaged by the explosion were insured with the same company, which paid out an average of £12-13 to each claimant. The company directors were sued by some of the shareholders for paying out unnecessary claims as the policies contained the statement "that the company should not be responsible for any loss or damage by explosion, except such as might arise from explosion by gas". The directors argued that the cause of the damage was the original fire and not the explosion. The court agreed with this, despite the general insurance principle of Causa Proxima Non Remota Spectatur ("the proximate and not the remote cause must be looked into") which would hold that the fire was a remote cause and the proximate, or immediate cause, of the damage was the explosion. The case also led to a definition of the term "by gas" in the policy. The vice-chancellor of England decided that it should not be broadly construed as all explosions were caused by ignition of gas and that "gas" in this context meant only "coal gas", which was then supplied to domestic premises for heating and lighting purposes.
