= Lady's Tree =

Scots pine in Loch of the Lowes, Perthshire, Scotland

- Interactive map of Lady's Tree
- Species: Scots pine (Pinus sylvestris)
- Location: Loch of the Lowes, Perthshire, Scotland, UK
- Coordinates: 56°34′33″N 3°33′33.9″W
- Height: 60 feet (18 m)

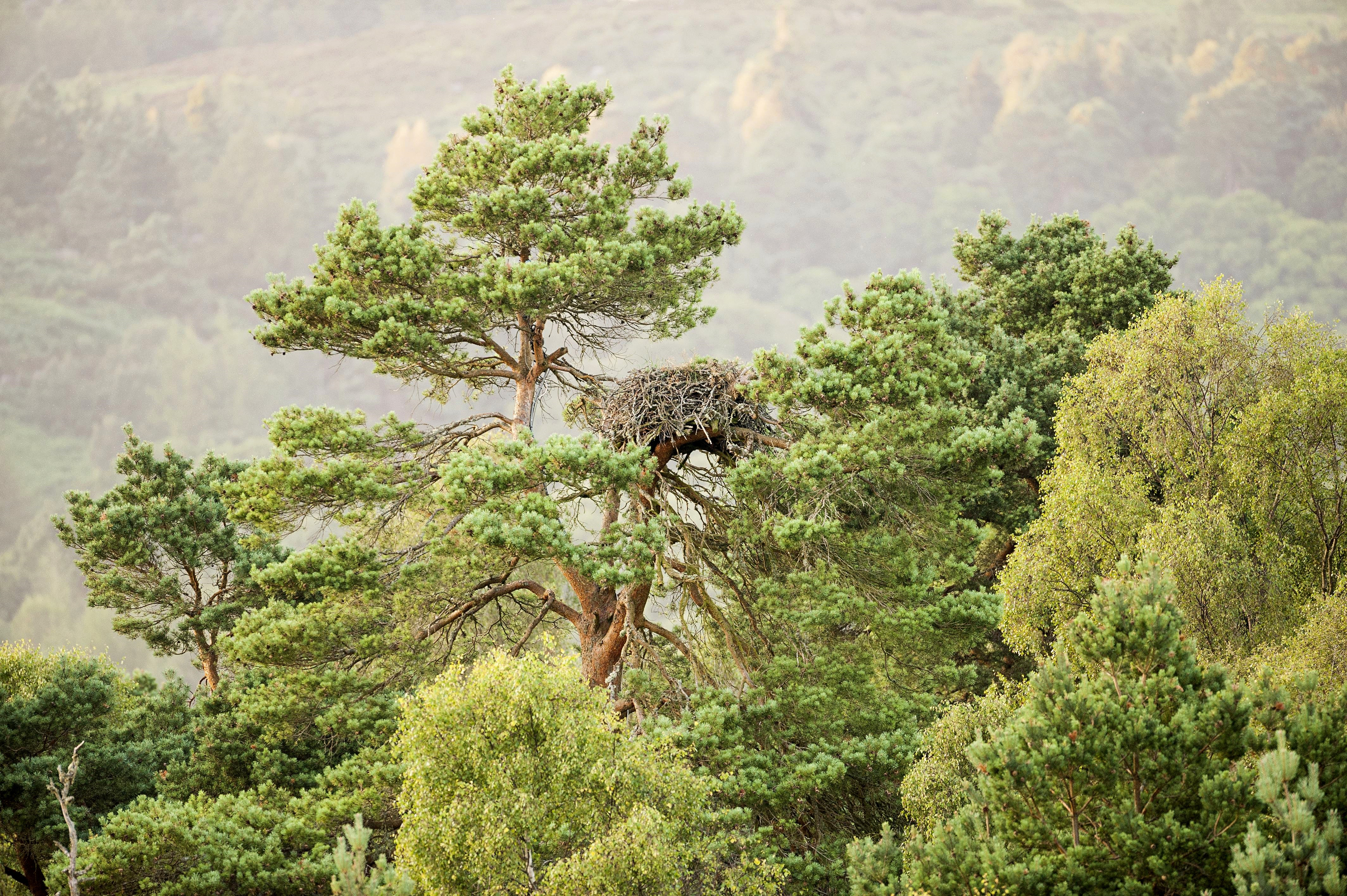
Lady's Trees in Loch of the Lowes near Dunkeld, Scotland

Lady's Tree is a Scots pine on the banks of the Loch of the Lowes, Scotland. It was the roost of famous osprey 'Lady' for 24 years. In 2014, Lady's Tree was named Scotland's Tree of the Year.

== Description ==
Scots pines are large, evergreen trees, which are native to the United Kingdom. Lady's Tree is 60 feet (18 m) tall and around 100 years old. It takes its name from the Loch of the Lowe's famous osprey, known as 'Lady'. Lady was one of the world's oldest known breeding osprey and made an important contribution to the conservation of her species, laying 71 eggs and raising 50 chicks over her time in Lady's Tree. 2014, the year Lady's Tree won Scotland's Tree of the Year, was Lady's last year in the tree.

In 2004, the Scottish Wildlife Trust set up a camera in the tree, and livestreamed the feed of the osprey nest. This feed has been viewed 1.3 million times from over 160 countries.
