= Šatės Eldership =

Eldership of Lithuania

The Šatės Eldership (Lithuanian: Šačių seniūnija) is an eldership of Lithuania, located in the Skuodas District Municipality. In 2021 its population was 870.
