= Gilwell Oak =

Oak tree in Gilwell Park, Essex, England

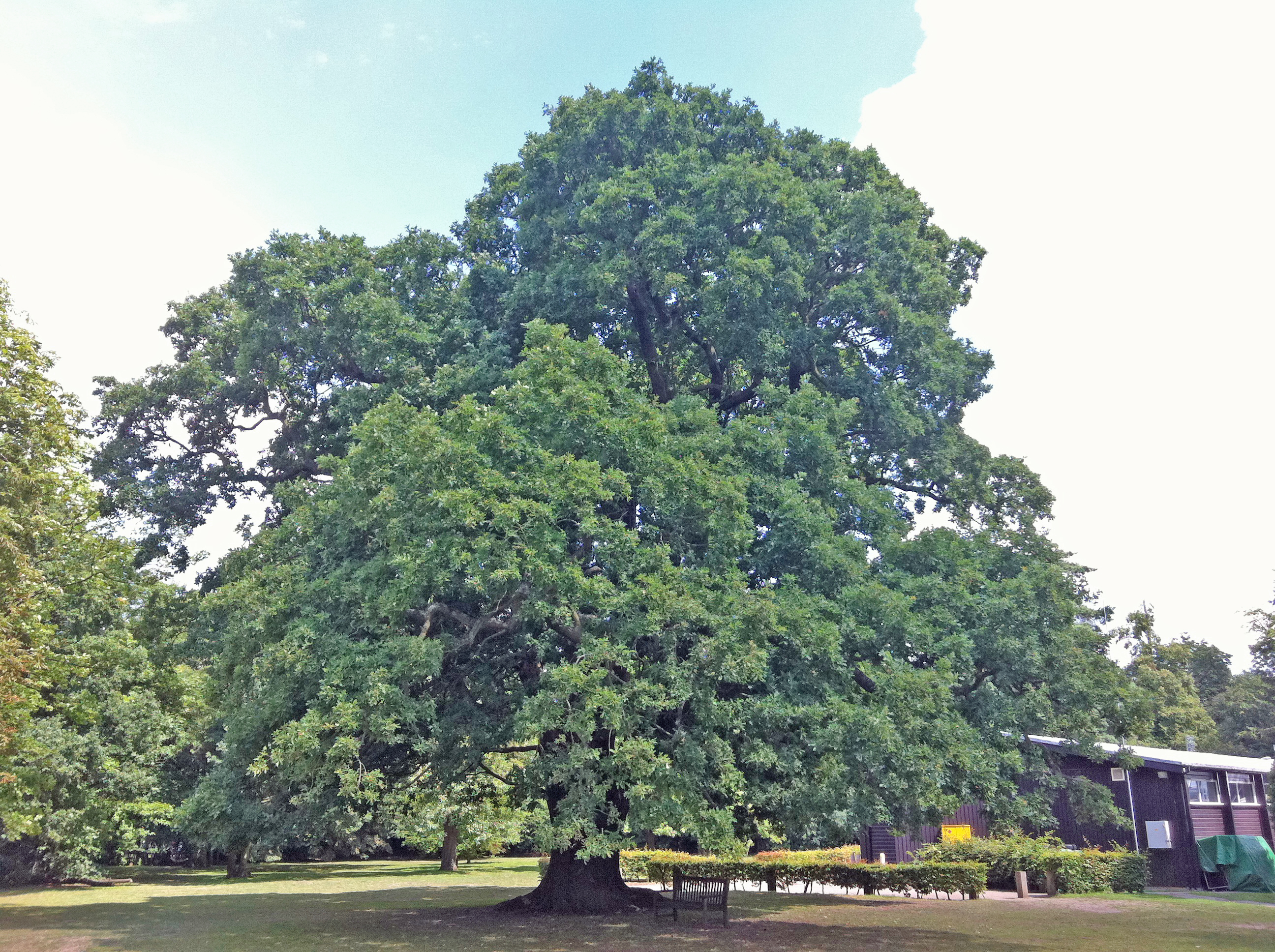
- Owner: The Scout Association
- Location: Gilwell Park
- Country: England
- Coordinates: 51°39′1″N 0°0′8″E
- Founded: Unknown

The Gilwell Oak is an oak tree on the grounds of The Scout Association's headquarters at Gilwell Park, Essex. It is reputed to have been used as a hiding place by Dick Turpin and since the 20th century has become closely associated with the Scout movement. The tree is situated close to the training ground for the association's first Scout leaders and provided material for the earliest Wood Badges. The oak inspired Scout movement founder Robert Baden-Powell to create "the moral of the acorn and the oak" an analogy for the growth of the Scout movement and the personal growth of its members. The Gilwell Oak was voted England's Tree of the Year by the public in 2017 and was subsequently selected by a panel of experts as the UK Tree of the Year.

== Description ==
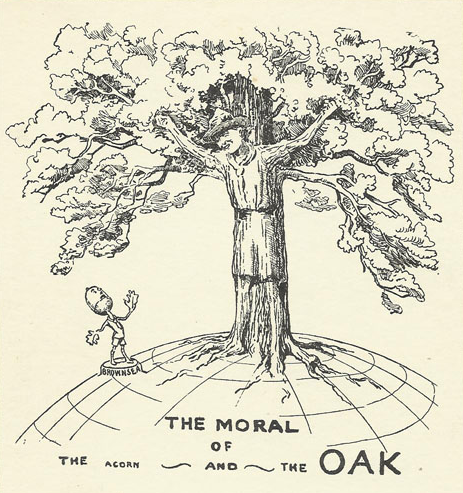
Baden-Powell's sketch of his acorn and oak analogy, inspired by the Gilwell Oak

The Gilwell Oak is a Common or English Oak (Quercus robur) of approximately 450–550 years of age. It is in Gilwell Park, a former country estate in Epping Forest that was purchased by The Scout Association in 1919 for use as their headquarters. The tree is reputed to have been used by the 18th-century highwayman Dick Turpin to ambush passing stagecoaches.

== Scouting ==
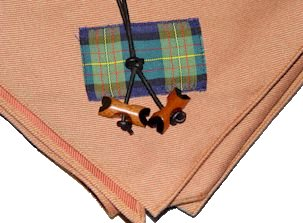
A modern Wood Badge

The oak is sited at the edge of Gilwell Park's training ground where the first Scout leader training was carried out. The Wood Badge, the bead insignia that mark completion of Scout leader training, is closely linked to the Gilwell Oak. Although the original beads came from Africa, reputedly having belonged to Dinizulu, the fallen branches of the Gilwell Oak were carved into early wood badges awarded to leaders trained at Gilwell. Modern wood badges are made from alternative materials but special commemorative beads carved from the Gilwell Oak are sold by The Scout Association to certified leaders.

Scouting's founder Robert Baden-Powell was inspired by the oak to write "the moral of the acorn and the oak" in around 1929 that held that "big things were possible from modest beginnings". Baden-Powell said that the growth of the oak from humble acorn to mighty tree was analogous to the growth of Scouting from the 1907 Brownsea Island Scout camp to a worldwide organisation and the similar personal growth of a young person passing through the movement.

Chief Scout of the Scout Association Bear Grylls said that "The Gilwell Oak has been the backdrop to hundreds of courses in which thousands of volunteer leaders have been inspired and motivated to change young people's lives. It's the unbending symbol of Scouting's desire to change the world for the better". The Gilwell Oak is a landmark at Gilwell Park and is visited by hundreds of Scouts each year, some of whom take a leaf or an acorn from the tree as a souvenir of their visit.

== Tree of the Year 2017 ==
The Gilwell Oak was nominated for English Tree of the Year 2017 and beat the nine other contenders, having polled 26% of the 7,000 public votes. It was subsequently chosen as UK Tree of Year from the winners of the four Home Nations by a panel of experts. The tree represented the UK at the European Tree of the Year Awards and came in fifth place with 12,955 votes. In commemoration of the tree's win the Scout Association was presented with a model of the tree.

== See also ==
- List of individual trees
