= European Tree of the Year =

Annual contest held in Europe

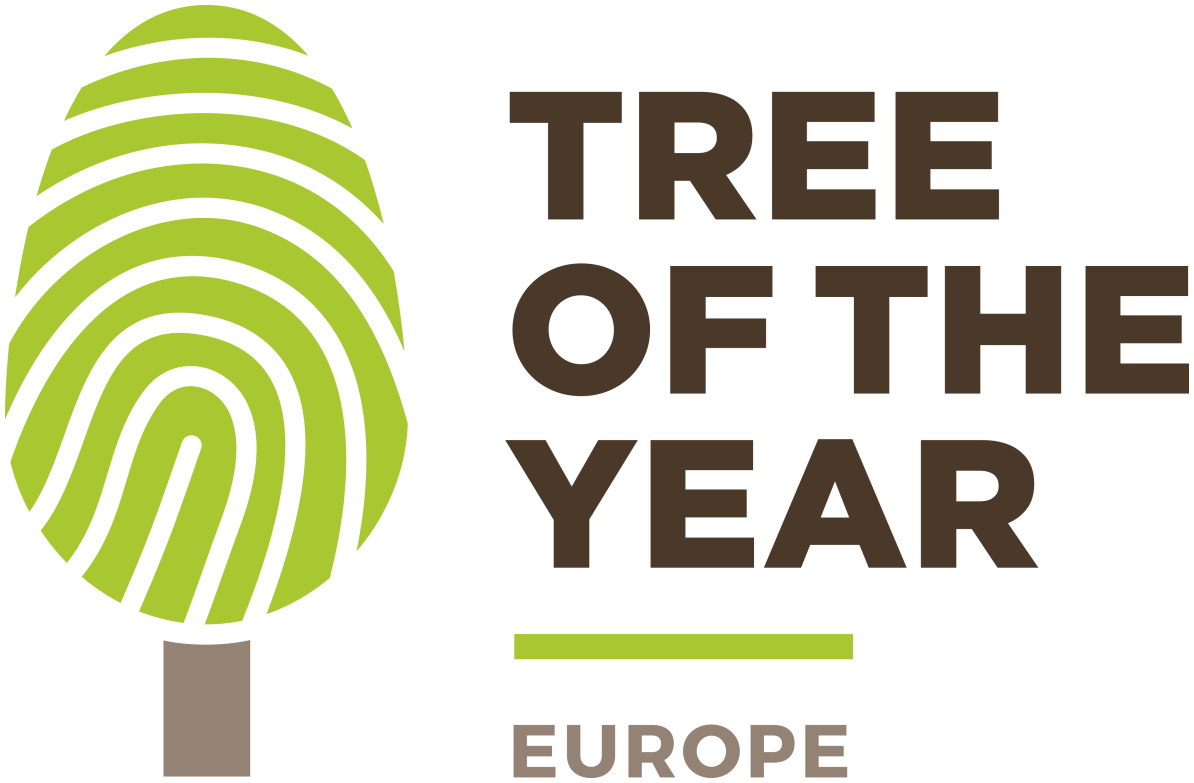
Logo of the European Tree of the Year contest

The European Tree of the Year is an annual contest held to find the most "loveable" tree in Europe.

The contest is held by the Environmental Partnership Association (EPA), an organization supported by the European Land Owners Association and the European Commission.

== History ==
The European Tree of the Year competition has been running since 2011 and selects a tree from participating countries (now 15 in number) by public vote. It was inspired by an earlier Czech national tree contest. Most countries hold a national poll to select their entrant for each year. Nominations are made in the year preceding the award. Voting for the European tree of the year commences on 1 February each year and lasts until the end of the month. A live, online display of the votes cast for each tree is displayed until the last week in February when final voting figures are kept secret. The winner is announced at an awards ceremony in late March held in the EU Parliament, Brussels.

Since 2015, there has been a promotional tree tour visiting many candidate trees during the voting month of February. Media PR events, and community, child led, art contests take place for each tree, with the winning art works being displayed at the awards ceremony.

In more recent years, a #TreesInNeed blog has been promoted by the contest organisers to highlight the plight of numerous trees across Europe under threat of destruction.

== Winners ==
European Tree of the Year winners
Year	Photo	Location	Name	Species	Ref.
2011		Leliceni, Romania	"Lime in Leliceni" (Romanian: Teiul din Leliceni, Hungarian: Csíkszentléleki hárs)	Tilia cordata	
2012		Felsőmocsolád, Hungary	"The Old Lime Tree of Felsőmocsolád" (Hungarian: Felsőmocsoládi öreg hárs)	Tilia sp.	
2013		Eger, Hungary	"Plane Tree in Eger" (Hungarian: Egri platán)	Platanus × hispanica	
2014		Sliven, Bulgaria	"The Old Elm" (Bulgarian: Старият бряст)	Ulmus minor	
2015		Orissaare, Estonia	"Oak Tree on a Football Field" (Estonian: Staadioni tamm)	Quercus robur	
2016		Bátaszék, Hungary	"The Oldest Tree of Bátaszék" (Hungarian: Bátaszék legöregebb fája)	Quercus pubescens	
2017		Wiśniowa, Poland	"Oak Józef" (Polish: Dąb Józef)	Quercus robur	
2018		Águas de Moura, Portugal	"Whistler Cork Oak Tree" (Portuguese: Sobreiro Monumental)	Quercus suber	
2019		Pécs, Hungary	"The Almond Tree of the Snowy Hill in Pécs" (Hungarian: A pécsi havi-hegyi mandulafa)	Prunus dulcis	
2020		Chudobín, Czech Republic	"Guardian of the Flooded Village" (Czech: Strážkyně zatopené obce)	Pinus sylvestris	
2021		Lecina, Spain	"The Millennial Carrasca of Lecina" (Spanish: Carrasca milenaria de Lecina)	Quercus rotundifolia	
2022		Przybudki, Poland	"Oak Dunin" (Polish: Dąb Dunin)	Quercus robur	
2023		Łódź, Poland	"Oak Fabrykant" (Polish: Dąb Fabrykant)	Quercus robur	
2024		Niemcza, Poland	"Heart of the Garden" (Polish: Serce Ogrodu)	Fagus sylvatica	
2025		Dalków, Poland	"Heart of the Dalkowskie Hills" (Polish: Serce Wzgórz Dalkowskich)	Fagus sylvatica	
2026		Rukai, Lithuania	"Oak of Laukiai" (Lithuanian: Laukių ąžuolas)	Quercus robur	

=== Winners by country ===
Country	Number
Poland	5
Hungary	4
Bulgaria	1
Czech Republic	1
Estonia	1
Portugal	1
Romania	1
Spain	1
Lithuania	1

=== Winners by genus ===
Genus	Number
Quercus (oak)	8
Tilia (linden/lime)	2
Fagus (beech)	2
Pinus (pine)	1
Platanus (plane)	1
Prunus (almond)	1
Ulmus (elm)	1

== See also ==
- European City of the Trees
- Tree of the Year (United Kingdom)
- Tree of the Year (Portugal)
- List of individual trees
