= List of oldest trees =

List of longest living trees

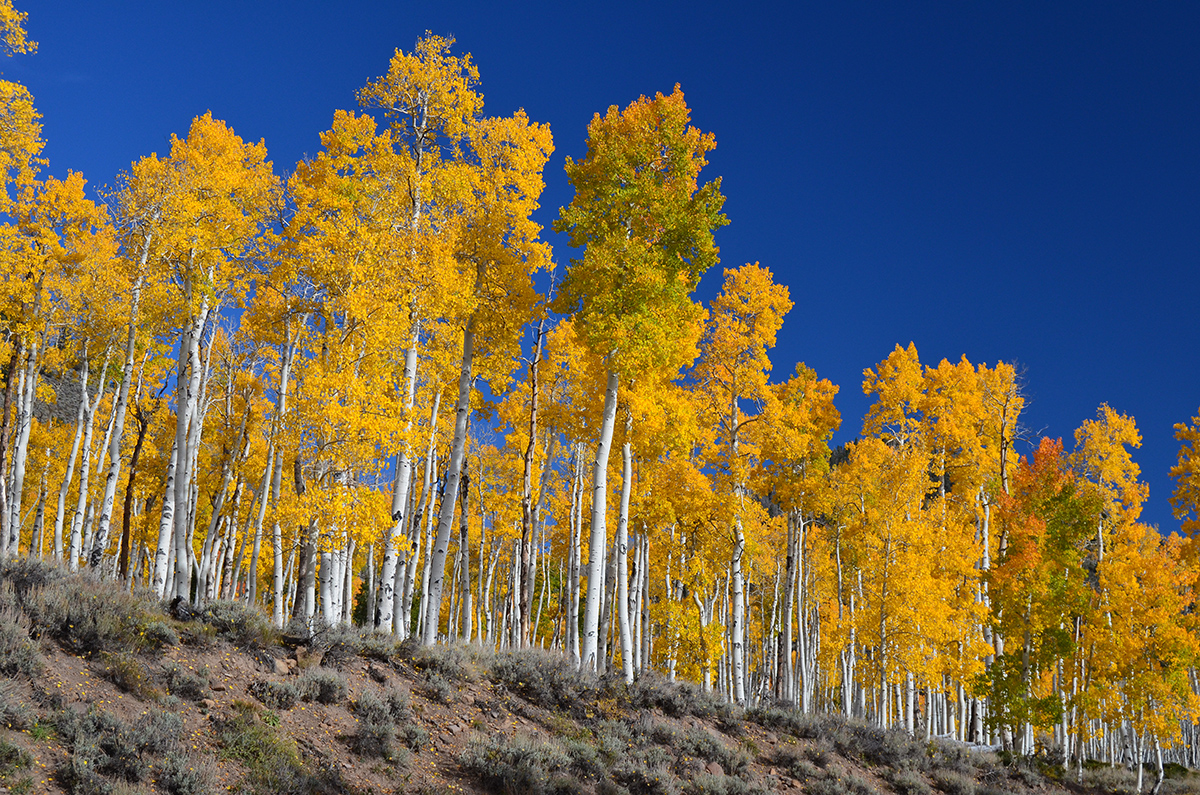
Pando, a colony of quaking aspen, is one of the oldest-known clonal trees. Recent estimates of its age range from 16,000 to 37,000 by the latest (2024) estimate. It is located in Utah, United States.

Definitions of longevity vary between clonal trees, ones where parts of the tree continue to live after the death of the first trunk or trunks, and non-clonal trees. Tree ages are derived from a variety of sources, including documented "tree-ring" (dendrochronological) count core samples, radiocarbon dating, girth-to-age formulas, and estimates from growth rates. For these reasons, there are three lists of "oldest trees" here, using different criteria.

The three tables of trees are listed by age and species. The first table describes trees for which a minimum age has been directly determined, either through counting or cross-referencing tree rings or through radiocarbon dating. Many of these trees may be even older than their listed ages, but the oldest wood in the tree has rotted away. For some old trees, so much of the center is missing that their age cannot be directly determined. Instead, estimates are made based on the tree's size and presumed growth rate. The second table includes trees with these estimated ages. The last table lists clonal colonies in which no individual tree trunks may be remarkably old but in which the organism as a whole is thought to be very old.

The record-holders for individual, non-clonal trees are the Great Basin bristlecone pine trees from California and Nevada, in the United States. Through tree-ring cross-referencing, they have been shown to be almost five thousand years old.

A clonal colony can survive for much longer than an individual tree. A colony of 48,000 quaking aspen trees (nicknamed Pando), covering 106 acres (43 ha) in the Fishlake National Forest of Utah, is considered one of the oldest and largest organisms in the world. Recent estimates set the colony's age at about 16,000 to 37,000 years, although tree ring samples date individual stems at rarely more than 130 years. A colony of Huon pine trees covering 2.5 acres (1.0 ha) on Mount Read (Tasmania) is estimated to be around 10,000 years old, as determined by DNA samples taken from pollen collected from the sediment of a nearby lake. Individual trees in this group date to no more than 4,000 years old, as determined by tree ring samples.

== Non-clonal trees with ages from cross-dating ==
Cross-dating via dendrochronology is the most exact method for dating a wood sample. Cross-dating is the method of finding the age of a tree ring by matching growth patterns across multiple trees from the same location. Cross-dating can date a wood sample to a precision of one year.

This list contains tree ages determined from dendrochronological cross-dating. It has all trees with ages more than 2000 years, and a sample of notable trees (one per species) younger than that. If cross-dating has not been reproducible (e.g., because a tree core has become missing), the unreproduced age is listed in the section below. If there are multiple ages (e.g., due to inconsistency in tree cores or lack of reproducibility), the lowest verified age is shown here, and the highest is shown in the estimated table, below.

Name	Age (years)	Year germinated	Species	Location	Country	Notes
Prometheus (WPN-114)	4,961	2936+ BCE	Great Basin bristlecone pine Pinus longaeva	Wheeler Peak, Nevada	United States	Cut down by Donald Rusk Currey in 1964.
Methuselah	4,669	2644 BCE	Great Basin bristlecone pine Pinus longaeva	White Mountains (California)	United States	It is the oldest known living (non-clonal) tree in the world.
Alerce Milenario or Gran Abuelo	3,655	1630+ BCE	Patagonian cypress Fitzroya cupressoides	Cordillera Pelada, Los Ríos	Chile	Alive. New unconfirmed estimation of 3463 BC (5,484 years in 2022) would make it the oldest (non-clonal) tree in the world. Located within Alerce Costero National Park.
CBR26	3,266	1374 BCE	Giant sequoia Sequoiadendron giganteum	Sierra Nevada, California	United States	Dead.
D-21	3,220	1305+ BCE	Giant sequoia Sequoiadendron giganteum	Sierra Nevada, California	United States	Dead.
D-23	3,075	1122+ BCE	Giant sequoia Sequoiadendron giganteum	Sierra Nevada, California	United States	Dead.
CMC 3	3,033	1240+ BCE	Giant sequoia Sequoiadendron giganteum	Sierra Nevada, California	United States	Dead.
Scofield Juniper	2,675	1510+ BCE	Sierra juniper Juniperus grandis	Sierra Nevada, California	United States	Dead.
BLK227	2,651	626 BCE	Bald cypress Taxodium distichum	Three Sisters Cove, Black River (North Carolina)	United States	
CB-90-11	2,469	444 BCE	Rocky Mountain bristlecone pine Pinus aristata	Central Colorado	United States	
?	2,247	222 BCE	Qilian juniper Juniperus przewalskii	Delingha, Qinghai Province	China	
Bennett Juniper	2,165	140 BCE	Sierra juniper Juniperus grandis	Sierra Nevada, California	United States	
SHP 7	2,110	?	Foxtail pine Pinus balfouriana	Sierra Nevada California	United States	
BLK232	2,095	70 BCE	Bald cypress Taxodium distichum	Three Sisters Cove, Black River (North Carolina)	United States	
CRE 175	2,054	29 BCE	Rocky Mountain juniper Juniperus scopulorum	Northern New Mexico	United States	
Miles Juniper	1,838	183	Sierra juniper Juniperus grandis	Sierra Nevada, California	United States	
KET 3996	1,728	297	Limber pine Pinus flexilis	Ketchum, Idaho	United States	
FL117	1,688	338	Northern whitecedar Thuja occidentalis	Ontario	Canada	
BCK 69	1,660	366	Bald cypress Taxodium distichum	Bladen County, North Carolina	United States	
?	1,636	?	Nootka cypress Callitropsis nootkatensis	Vancouver Island	Canada	
FL101	1,567	?	Northern whitecedar Thuja occidentalis	Ontario	Canada	
Cliff Cedar	1,414	?	Northern White Cedar; Thuja occidentalis	Fayette Historic State Park, Michigan	United States	Cliff trees, believed initially to be bushes and then to be young based on their size, discovered by Douglas Larson.
Italus	1,238	788	Heldreich's pine Pinus heldreichii	Pollino National Park	Italy	Alive. Oldest tree in Europe with verified age (radiocarbon calibrated tree-ring procedure).

== Non-clonal trees with estimated ages ==
Note: The ages of the trees in this list are estimated via methods that are less accurate than cross-dating. Some of the ages are based on tree size, which is known to have 20% error. Ages in this table should be treated as speculative.

Name	Age (years)	Species	Location	Country	Notes
Alerce Milenario or Gran Abuelo	5,484	Patagonian cypress Fitzroya cupressoides	Cordillera Pelada, Los Ríos	Chile	A new 2022 estimation of 5,484 years expands on a previous minimum age based on incomplete tree rings of 3,655.
? (Note: Not named yet)	5,078	Great Basin bristlecone pine Pinus longaeva	White Mountains (California)	United States	Tree cored by Edmund Schulman, age determined by Tom Harlan. However, core is missing and date is unconfirmed.
Methuselah	4,861 (Note: It is uncertain whether the tree was dated in 1957 or 1958, but "it seems likely the tree had 4,789 rings (crossdated) in the summer of 1957". The age given here is based on this reference point.)	Great Basin bristlecone pine Pinus longaeva	White Mountains (California)	United States	
Llangernyw Yew	4,000–5,000	Common yew Taxus baccata	Llangernyw, Conwy	United Kingdom	Girth of 10.75 m. Situated in the churchyard of St Dygain's Church in the village of Llangernyw, Wales. One of the 50 Great British Trees.
Sarv-e Abarkuh	4,500	Mediterranean cypress Cupressus sempervirens	Abarkuh, Yazd	Iran	Also called "Zoroastrian Sarv".
Gümeli Porsuğu	4,115	Yew; Taxus baccata	Zonguldak	Turkey	Alive, found in 2016.
The Ancient Yew	4,000	Yew; Taxus baccata	Tisbury, Wiltshire	United Kingdom	37 feet in circumference. Situated in the churchyard of St John's, Tisbury. Carbon dated by David Bellamy.
The Senator	3,500	Pond cypress Taxodium ascendens	Longwood, Florida	United States	Died in January 2012 from human-caused fire.
Oliveira do Mouchão (KNJ1/601)	3,350	European olive tree Olea europea L. var. europaea	Mouriscas, Abrantes	Portugal	Alive. In 2016, José Luís Lousada, a researcher at the University of Trás-os-Montes and Alto Douro, estimated the tree's age at approximately 3350 years using dendrometry. According to this assessment with an estimate age precision of 2%, it is considered the oldest tree in Portugal.
S'Ozzastru	3,000–4,000	Olive; Olea europaea	Luras, Sardinia	Italy	
The President	3,200	Giant sequoia Sequoiadendron giganteum	Sierra Nevada, California	United States	Alive.
Fortingall Yew	3,000	Common yew Taxus baccata	Fortingall, Perthshire	United Kingdom	Alive. Possibly the oldest tree in Britain.
Alishan Sacred Tree	3,000	Formosan cypress Chamaecyparis formosensis	Alishan National Scenic Area, Chiayi	Taiwan	Collapsed on 1 July 1997, following heavy rainstorms.
Patriarca da Floresta	3,020	Jequitibá-rosa Cariniana legalis	Santa Rita do Passa Quatro, São Paulo	Brazil	Alive. Probably the oldest non-conifer in Brazil. Its name translates as "Patriarch of the Forest". Located at the Vassununga State Park.
Great Camphor of Takeo	3,000+	Cinnamomum camphora "Camphor Tree"	Takeo, Saga	Japan	A large Camphor tree reputed to be over 3,000 years old. Worshipped at a Shinto shrine dedicated to the tree, dating back to the 700s C.E. Alive.
Raintree	3,000+	Great Basin bristlecone pine	Spring Mountains, Nevada	United States	Great Basin Bristlecone Pine located near Kyle Canyon in the Spring Mountain range in Southern Nevada, USA. Estimated 3000 years old but never cored.
Oliveira de Santa Iria de Azóia	2,850	Olive; Olea europaea	Santa Iria de Azoia, Loures	Portugal	Magnificent Olive tree, probably the last one from a large olive grove. Studied by UTAD University and now classified "Public interest tree" by the Portuguese National Forest Authority; Tree ID
Mother of the Forest	2,520	Giant sequoia Sequoiadendron giganteum	Sierra Nevada, Calaveras Big Trees State Park, California	United States	Dead.
?	2,522	Coast redwood Sequoia sempervirens	California	United States	
Sarv Zibad	2,500	Mediterranean cypress Cupressus sempervirens	Sarv Zibad, Khorasan	Iran	Also called "holly Sarv".
Panke baobab	2,465	African baobab Adansonia digitata	Matabeleland North	Zimbabwe	Died in 2011; the oldest non-clonal angiosperm ever documented.
Jaya Sri Maha Bodhi	2,312	Sacred fig Ficus religiosa	Anuradhapura, North Central Province	Sri Lanka	A sapling claimed to be from the Bodhi tree, the legendary tree under which the Buddha is said to have become enlightened. It was brought to its current location and planted at around 288 BCE by Sanghamitra, daughter of Emperor Ashoka. It is the oldest living human-planted tree in the world with a known planting date.
General Sherman	2,300–2,700	Giant sequoia Sequoiadendron giganteum	Giant Forest, Sequoia National Park, California	United States	Alive with a height of 83.8 meters (275 ft), a diameter of 11 m (36 ft) at its base, and an estimated bole volume of 1,487 m^{3} (52,513 cu ft), it is the largest known living single-stem tree, and among the tallest, widest, and longest-lived of all trees on Earth.
Kayano Ōsugi	2,300	Japanese cedar Cryptomeria japonica	Yamanaka Onsen, Ishikawa	Japan	Girth of 9.6 m. One of the four trees believed to be sacred in the precincts in a Shinto shrine. Its name translates as "Great Sugi of Kayano".
Oliveira de Santa Luzia	2,210	Olive; Olea europaea	Santa Luzia, Tavira, Algarve	Portugal	Alive.
Jōmon Sugi	2,170–7,200	Japanese cedar Cryptomeria japonica	Yakushima	Japan	Girth of 16.4 m. Exact dating is made difficult by the rotten core of the trunk. Its name is a reference to the Jōmon period of Japanese prehistory.
Ballyconnell Yew	2,000–5,000	Yew; Taxus baccata	Ballyconnell, Annagh	Ireland	Oldest tree in Ireland.
Elia Vouvon	2,000–5,000	Olive; Olea europaea	Kolymvari, Crete	Greece	Its name translates as "Olive Tree of Vouves".
Castagnu dê Centu Cavaddi	2,000–4,000	Sweet chestnut Castanea sativa	Sicily	Italy	Its name translates as the "Hundred Horse Chestnut".
Chandelier Tree	2,000-2,500	Coast redwood Sequoia sempervirens	Leggett, California	United States	The name "Chandelier Tree" comes from its unusual limbs that resemble a chandelier. The limbs, which measure from 4 to 7 ft (1.2 to 2.1 m) in diameter, begin 100 ft (30 m) above the ground. It is 2,400 years old.
Ulleungdo Hyangnamu	2,000–3,000	Chinese juniper Juniperus chinensis	Ulleung-gun, Gyeongbuk	South Korea	Girth of 4.5 m. One of the main branches was broken in 1985 by typhoon "Brenda".
Stara Maslina	2,249 (2,016-2482)	Olive; Olea europaea	Stari Bar, Bar	Montenegro	
Tnjri	2,040+	Oriental plane Platanus orientalis	Khojavend, Karabakh	Azerbaijan	Oldest tree in a part of Azerbaijan. Its trunk is hollow. Also known as "Sose's Tree".
Koca Katran	2,030	Lebanon cedar Cedrus libani	Antalya	Turkey	Alive.
?	2,010	Olive; Olea europaea	Exo Hora, Zakynthos	Greece	
?	2,010	Yew; Taxus	Sochi, Krasnodar Krai	Russia	A grove known to possess several 2,000-year-old specimens.
Houkisugi at Nakagawa	2,000	Japanese cedar Cryptomeria japonica	Nakagawa Settlement, Yamakita, Kanagawa	Japan	
Lady Liberty	2,000+	Bald cypress Taxodium distichum	Longwood, Florida	United States	Sometimes called the "Companion Tree" to 'Senator".
Tejo Milenario	2,000+	Yew; Taxus baccata	Cazorla, Jaén	Spain	Oldest tree in Spain.
?	1,953	Subalpine larch Larix lyallii	Kananaskis, Alberta	Canada	
The Pechanga Great Oak Tree	1,000-2,000	Coast live oak Quercus agrifolia	Temecula, California	United States	Oldest oak tree in the United States, possibly in the world.
Methuselah	1,800	Coast redwood Sequoia sempervirens	Woodside, California	United States	
Araucaria Madre	1,810	Araucaria araucana	Araucanía	Chile	Located in Parque Nacional Conguillío. 1,800 rings account for at least 1,800 years.
Granit oak	1,679	Pedunculate oak Quercus robur	Granit	Bulgaria	
Kongeegen	1,500–2,000	Pedunculate oak Quercus robur	Jægerspris Nordskov, Zealand	Denmark	
Stelmužė Oak	1,500–2,000	Pedunculate oak Quercus robur	Stelmužė, Zarasai	Lithuania	Oldest tree in the Baltic states. Likely oldest oak in Europe.
Vilémovice Yew	1,500–2,000	Common yew Taxus baccata	Vilémovice	Czech Republic	345 cm (136 in) in circumference.
Aubépines	1,500	Common hawthorn Crataegus monogyna	Saint-Mars-sur-la-Futaie, Mayenne	France	Oldest tree in France.
Jardine Juniper	1,500	Rocky Mountain juniper Juniperus scopulorum	Logan Canyon, Utah	United States	
Árbol del Tule	1,433–1,600	Montezuma cypress Taxodium mucronatum	Santa María del Tule, Oaxaca	Mexico	Stoutest tree trunk in the world. Its name translates as the "Tule Tree".
Baikushev's pine	1,300	Heldreich's pine Pinus heldreichii	Pirin Mountains	Bulgaria	Oldest known coniferous tree in Bulgaria. It is named after its discoverer, forest ranger Kostadin Baikushev.
Te Matua Ngahere	1,200–4,000	Kauri; Agathis australis	Waipoua Forest, Northland	New Zealand	Oldest tree in New Zealand. Its name translates as "Father of the Forest".
Cis Henrykowski	1270	Common Yew; Taxus Baccata	Henryków Lubański, Lower Silesia,	Poland	Oldest tree in Poland. The age of the tree was estimated based on the trunk circumference and growth rate assessed by taking a core from an undamaged part of the trunk. If the trunk is the result of the fusion of two or three trunks, its age may be younger.
Algarrobo Abuelo	1,200+	Algarrobo; Prosopis chilensis	Villa de Merlo, San Luis Province	Argentina	Possibly oldest algarrobo in Argentina.
"The Sisters" or "Sisters Olive Trees of Noah"	1,163 ±131	Olive; Olea europaea	Bchaaleh, North Governorate	Lebanon	Folk legend also ascribes The Sisters as the source of the olive branch returned to Noah's Ark at the waning of the Biblical Flood.

== Clonal trees ==
As with all long-lived plant and fungal species, no individual part of a clonal colony is alive (in the sense of active metabolism) for more than a very small fraction of the life of the entire clone. Some clonal colonies may be fully connected via their root systems, while most are not actually interconnected, but are genetically identical clones which populated an area through vegetative reproduction. Ages for clonal colonies, often based on current growth rates, are estimates.

Name	Age (years)	Species	Location	Country	Notes
?	43,600–130,000	King's lomatia Lomatia tasmanica	Southwest National Park, Tasmania	Australia	Lomatia tasmanica is an endangered species with only one population, consisting of several hundred genetically identical individuals. Although it flowers occasionally, fruit production has never been observed, and it propagates vegetatively. Fossilized leaves are dated as at least 43,600 years old, found in sediments with a maximum age of 130,000.
Pando	less than 16,000–37,000	Quaking aspen Populus tremuloides	Fishlake National Forest, Utah	United States	Covers 107 acres (0.43 km^{2}) and has around 47,000 stems (aged up to 130 years), which continually die and are renewed by its roots. Is also the heaviest-known organism, weighing 6,000 tonnes.
Jurupa Oak	13,000	Palmer oak Quercus palmeri	Jurupa Mountains, California	United States	Quercus palmeri Engelm. = Quercus dunnii Kellogg.
Old Tjikko	9,550	Norway spruce Picea abies	Fulufjället National Park, Dalarna	Sweden	The tree's stems live no more than 600 years, but its root system's age was established using carbon dating and genetic matching. Elsewhere in the Fulu mountains, 20 spruces have been found older than 8,000 years.
Old Rasmus	9,500	Norway spruce Picea abies	Sonfjället, Härjedalen	Sweden	
Mongarlowe mallee	3,000–13,000	Mongarlowe mallee Eucalyptus recurva	Mongarlowe, New South Wales	Australia	Alive. A critically endangered species, known only from 6 wild individuals, first described in the 1980s. Based on the size and growth rate of its lignotuber, the largest single specimen is estimated to be 3,000 years old. However, it is possible that two other specimens are actually the result of a split in the original rootstock, and based on their spread of 26m would be estimated at 13,000 years old, potentially the oldest single tree on earth.
?	3,000–10,000	Huon pine Lagarostrobos franklinii	Mount Read, Tasmania	Australia	Several genetically identical males that have reproduced vegetatively. Although single trees in this stand may be around 3 to 4 thousand years old, the stand itself as a single organism has existed for 10,000 years.
Antarctic beech	2,000	Antarctic beech Nothofagus moorei	Repeater Station Road, Springbrook National Park, Queensland	Australia	Three individuals approximately 2000 years old are the parent trees to others in the surrounding forest; they grow clones by coppicing new shoots radially, forming a ring at the base of the parent tree trunk.

== See also ==
- King Clone
- List of individual trees
- List of largest giant sequoias
- List of longest-living organisms
- List of old-growth forests
- List of superlative trees
- Oldest viable seed
- Veteran tree

== Sources ==
Books

- Farmer, Jared (2022). Elderflora: A Modern History of Ancient Trees (First ed.). New York: Basic Books. ISBN 978-0-465-09784-5. LCCN 2022014665. OCLC 1296941940.
