= Lady Liberty (tree) =

Old tree in Longwood, Florida, U.S.

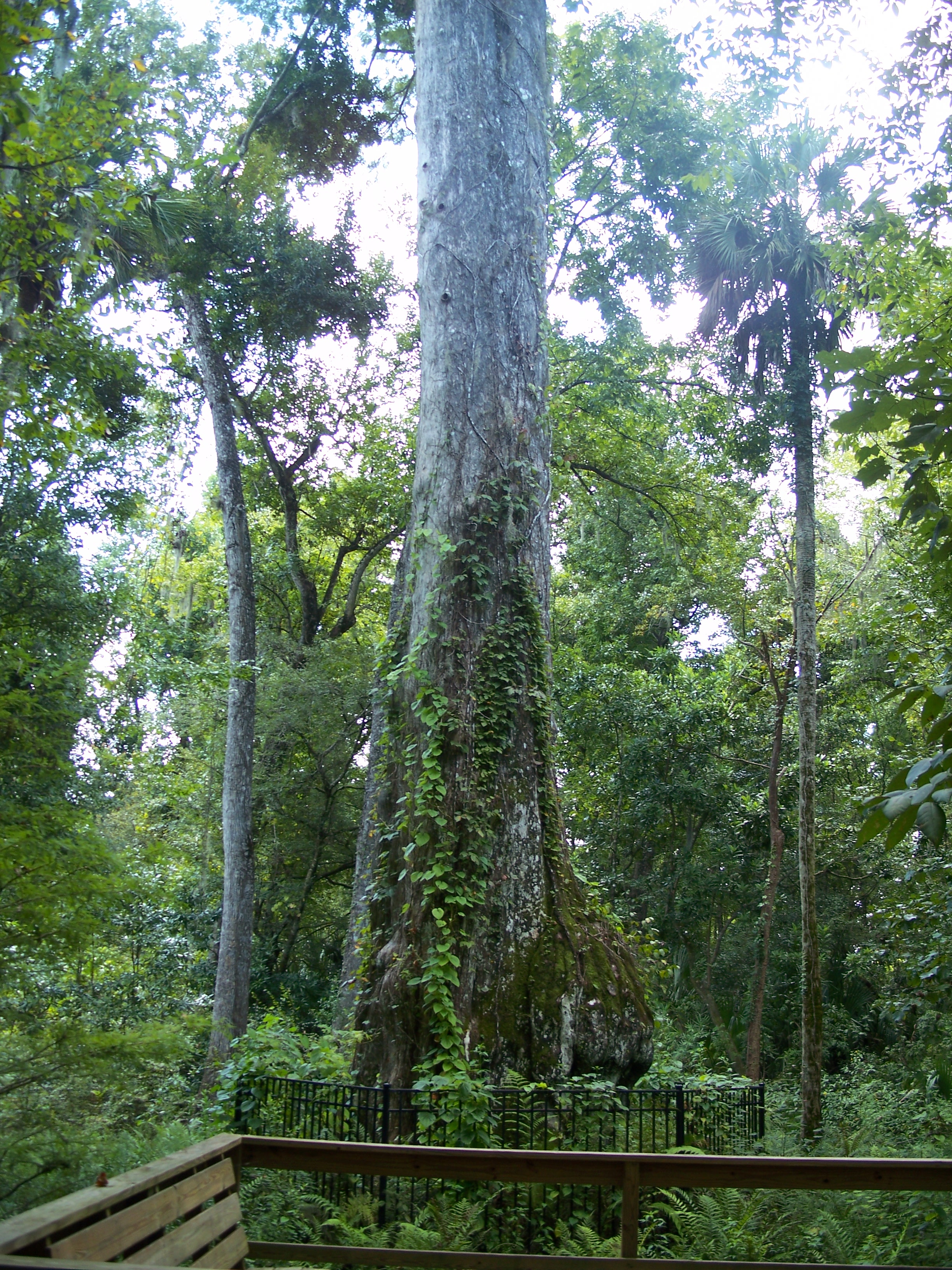
- Lady Liberty in 2007.

- Location within Florida
- Species: Bald cypress (Taxodium distichum)
- Location: Longwood, Florida
- Coordinates: 28°43′11.2″N 81°19′52.65″W

Lady Liberty is a bald cypress (Taxodium distichum) located in Big Tree Park in Longwood, Florida. The tree is over 2,000 years old and stands 40 feet (12 m) from the former site of The Senator, a 3,500-year-old Bald Cypress that burned down on January 16, 2012. With the Senator's demise, Big Tree Park has taken greater notice of its last remaining giant and has taken steps to ensure its preservation.

== Dimensions ==
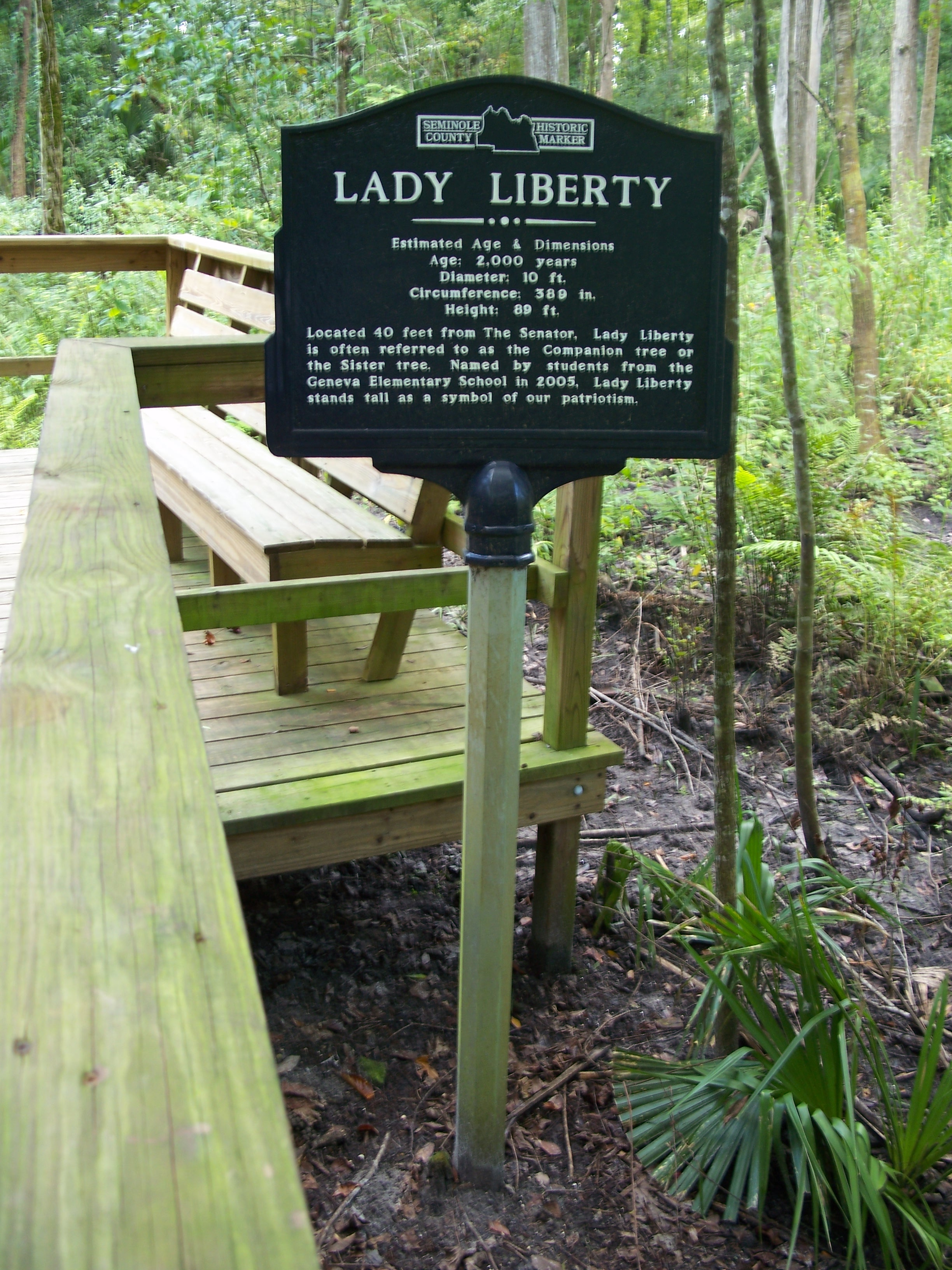
Historical marker at the base of the tree

At the time of its last recorded measurement in 2015, the tree stood 82 feet tall with a trunk circumference of 394 inches and a crown spread of 34 feet. Its dimensions do not grant it status as a Florida Champion tree of its species, but it is listed among numerous challengers.

== Age ==
No specific aging statistics for the tree are available. However based on its size, numerous forestry sources—including the county's historical marker for the tree—estimate that the tree is at least 2,000 years old.

== Name ==
For years, the large tree standing nearby The Senator was simply called "The Companion." However, in 2005, Geneva Elementary School held a contest to find a more suitable name for the tree. Two fifth graders submitted the name "Lady Liberty," winning the contest. One of the tree's branches stands at an angle which, if viewed correctly, "sort of looks like the uplifted arm of the Statue of Liberty".

== Preservation ==
Lady Liberty has only been directly viewable since 2005, when the tree was officially renamed. At that point, the county extended the boardwalk to provide access to the tree and also erected a protective fence surrounding it. Since the destruction of The Senator, the tree has assumed the spotlight at Big Tree Park as Seminole county seeks to both maintain the park's popularity and to ensure the preservation of its last remaining giant. The park remained closed for several months immediately after the fire during which time both Lady Liberty and The Senator's former location were surrounded by new, taller and stronger fences. In 2015, a group of arborists petitioned the county to take cuttings from the tree, treating them with steroids to initiate root growth, with the goal of creating a successful clone of the tree.

== See also ==
- List of oldest trees
- List of individual trees
