= Gümeli Porsuğu =

Yew tree in Turkey

Coordinates: 41.0364°N 31.6339°E

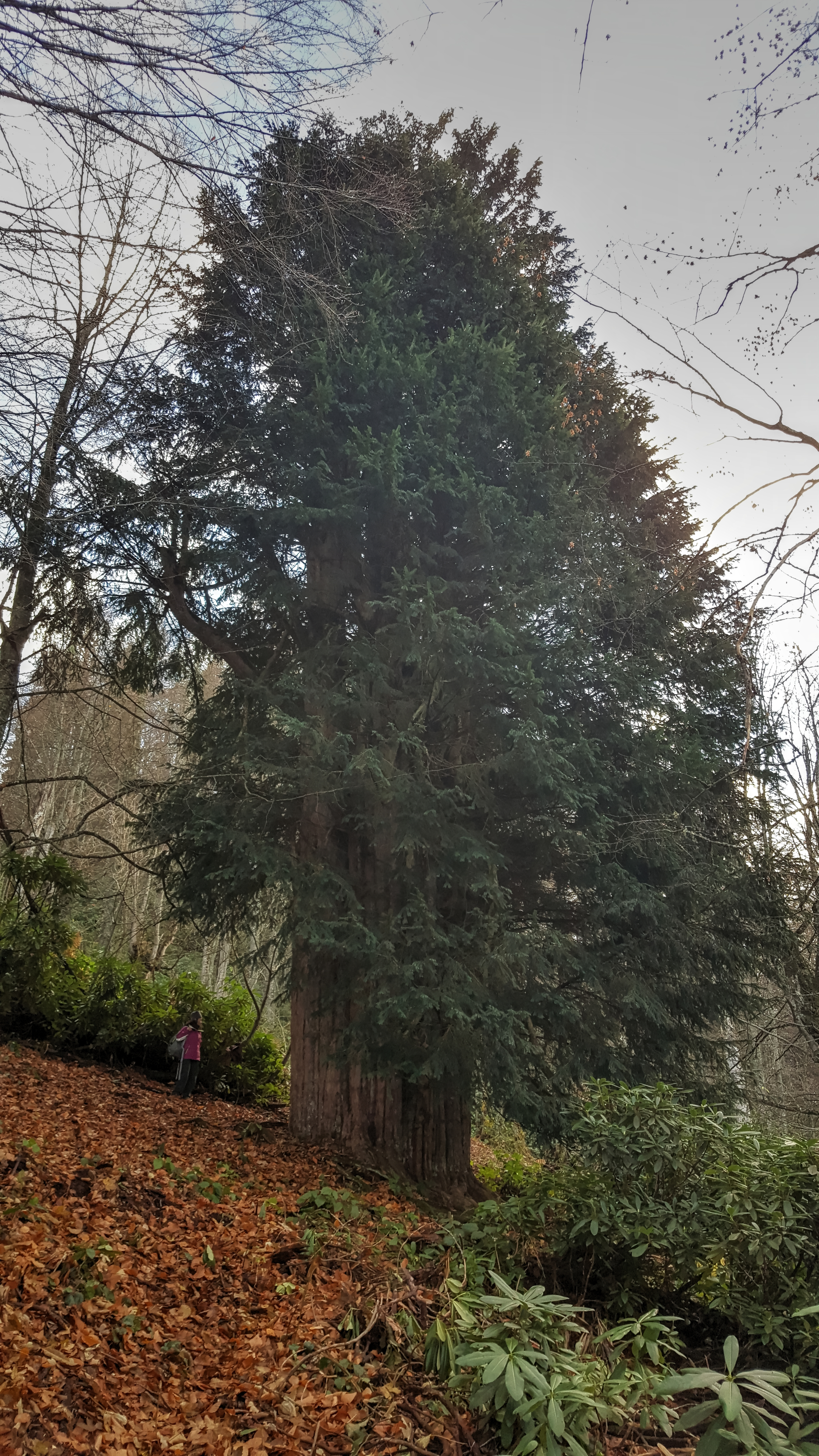
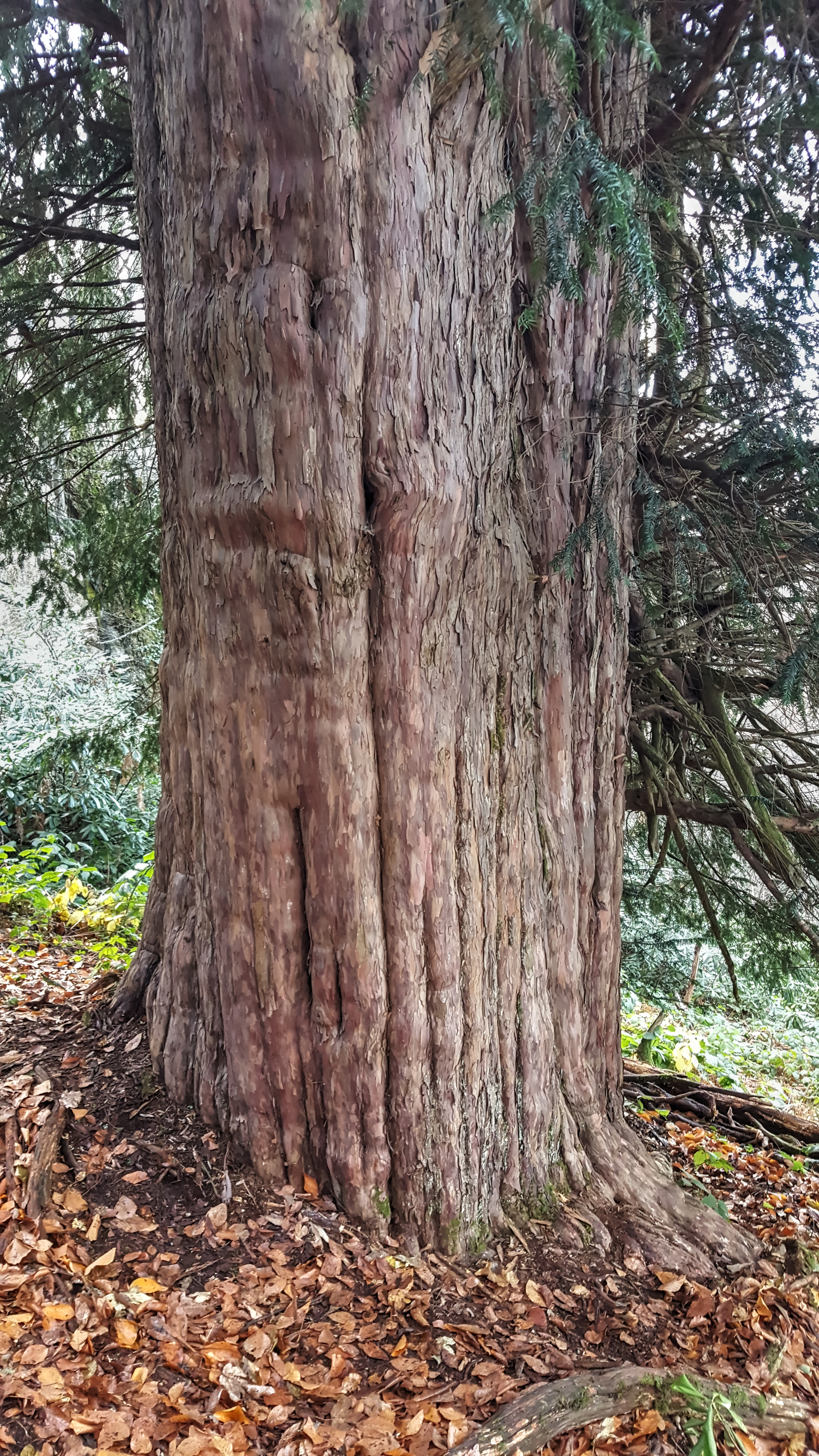
Gümeli Porsuğu in 2016

Gümeli Porsuğu is a yew tree (Taxus baccata) growing high in Zonguldak districtin Black Sea Region of Turkey. As of 2019, it was estimated to be 4,115 years old.

The region where the tree is located was included within the borders of Gümeli Nature Monument on July 14, 2016. The Gümeli yew tree was also registered as a Memorial Tree on April 2, 2018.

The age of the Gümeli Porsuğu was estimated between 1950 and 2000 according to the calculation made by İstanbul Üniversitesi Orman Fakültesi Orman Botaniği Anabilim Dalı Dendrokronoloji Laboratuvarı (Dendrochronology Laboratory of Istanbul University Faculty of Forestry, Department of Forestry), using 2 increment items taken from the same tree in 2017.

== See also ==
- List of oldest trees
- List of individual trees
- Koca Katran
