= Stelmužė Oak =

Oak tree in Lithuania

Coordinates: 55.8298°N 26.2174°E

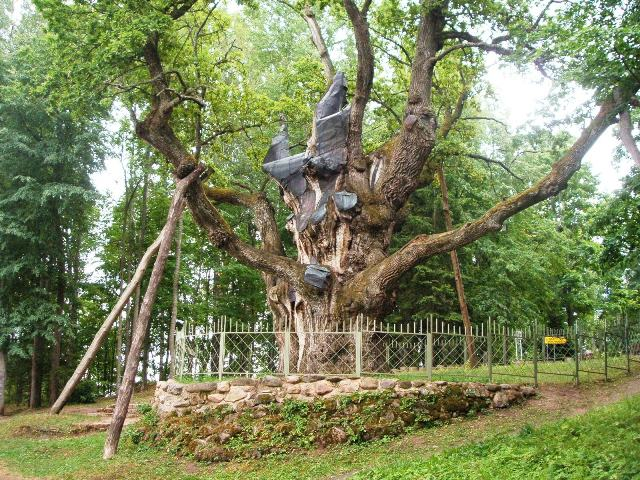
The oak in 2007

The Stelmužė Oak (Lithuanian: Stelmužės ąžuolas) is a common oak tree which grows in the former Stelmužė Manor park by Stelmužė [stεɫˈmʊʒeː] village, Zarasai district, Lithuania.

The oak measures 3.5 m in diameter and 13 m in girth at its widest part; being 2.8 m. and 9.58 m at waist level. The oak reaches 23 m in height with only side branches remaining alive. It is believed to be at least 1,500 years old, possibly, as much as 2,000 years old; this makes it the oldest oak in Lithuania and one of the oldest in Europe. However, exact age measurements are difficult, as the inner part of the trunk has been removed.

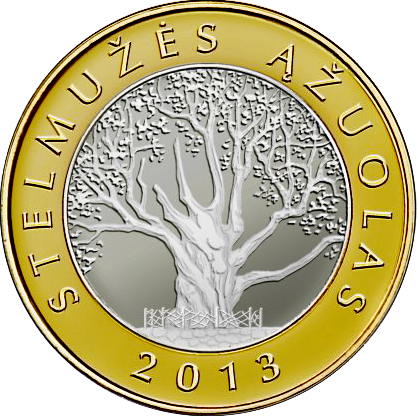
2 litai coin, 2013 issue

The oak has been protected since 1960. In 1987 it was listed as state natural monument of republican significance of the Lithuanian SSR. In 2000 the oak was declared a natural monument and included in the list of protected objects in Lithuania and in 2003 it was declared the botanical natural heritage site.

The oak is heavily damaged by various infections, fungi and overgrown with moss. The branches are supported. Although in early March 2021 new supports were installed, one branch broke on 31 March 2021. Since 2005 the state of the oak was researched and maintained by Czech arborist Martin Nemec. He identified major threats and suggested a long-time maintenance plan.

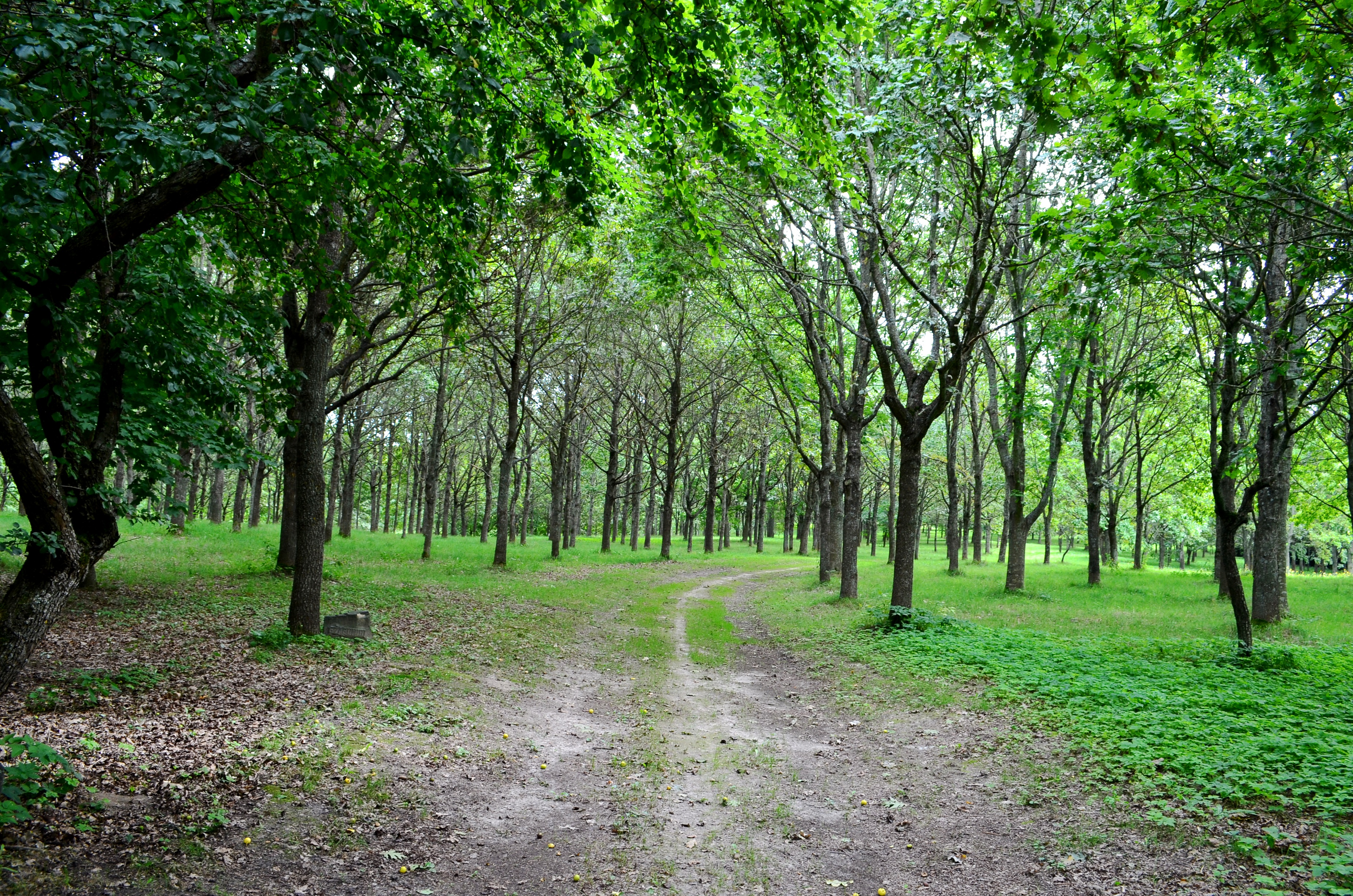
Somewhere in the National Revival Oak Grove an offsping of the Stelmužė Oak grows

An offspring from the acorns of Stelmužė Oak grows in the National Revival Oak Grove (Tautinio atgimimo ąžuolynas) by Jonas Basanavičius's native homestead and museum, together with the offspring of other famous Lithuanian oaks.

== See also ==
- List of individual trees
- List of oldest trees
