= Storkeegen =

Coordinates: 55°54′40.68″N 11°58′54.00″E

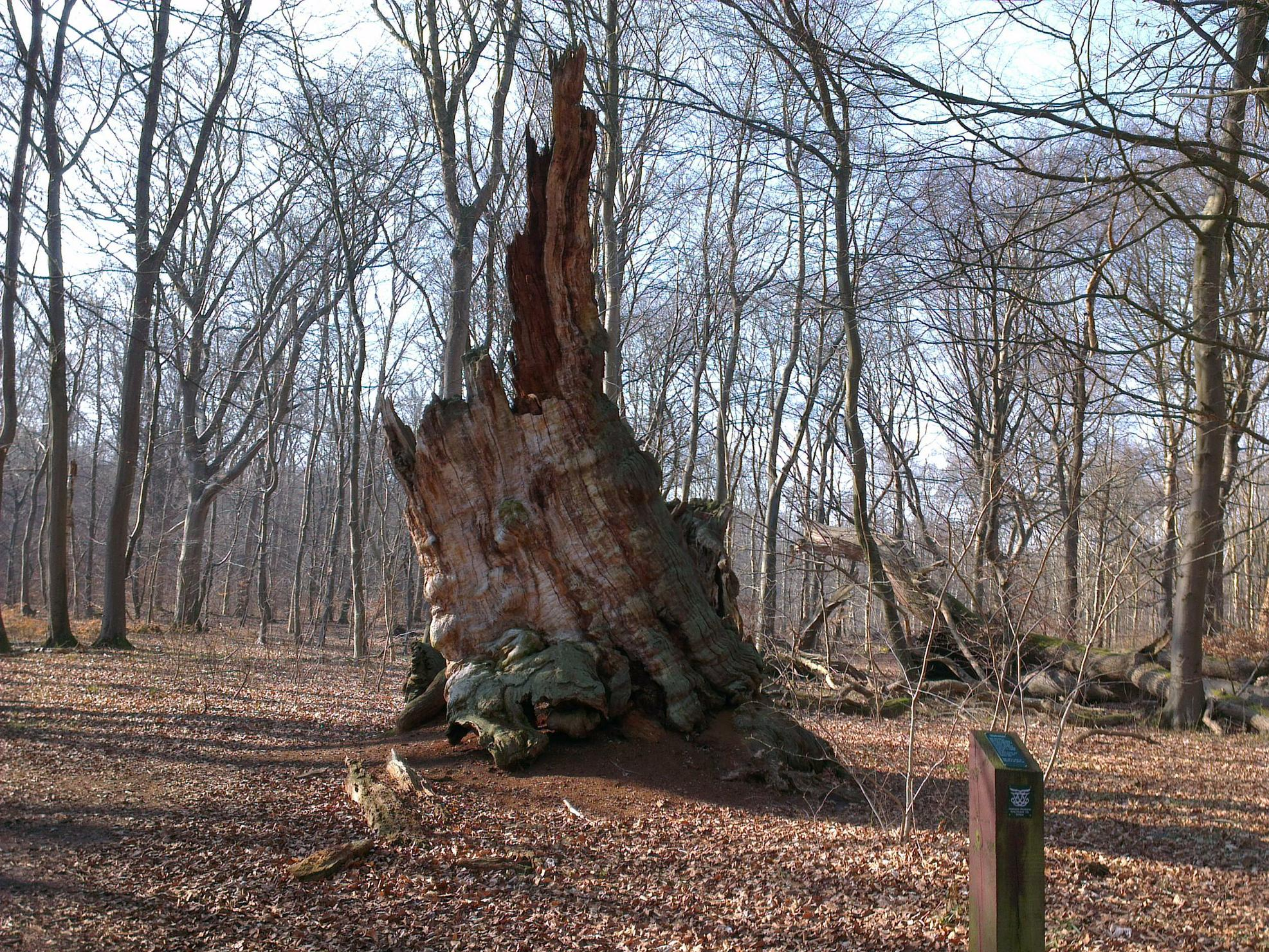
The remains of Storkeegen.

Storkeegen was a pedunculate oak located in Jægerspris Nordskov, near the town Jægerspris in Denmark. The remains of Storkegen are located in the same forest as Kongeegen and Snoegen.

All that remains of the ancient oak is a piece of the trunk. In 1974 the trunk broke just above the lowest branch at a height of four meters. Because the lowest branch survived, the tree managed to live on until 1981, when it was killed by a hurricane. It is estimated that the tree was 800 years old.

Storkeegen is named after the nest of a white stork that built its nest in the tree sometime during the nineteenth century. In 1843, the painter Peter Christian Thamsen Skovgaard painted Storkeegen and named this painting Eg med Storkerede i Nordskoven ved Jægerspris. This work became part of the Danish Royal Collection.

== See also ==
- List of individual trees
