= Olive tree of Vouves =

Exceptionally old olive tree in Crete, Greece

Coordinates: 35°29′12″N 23°47′13″E

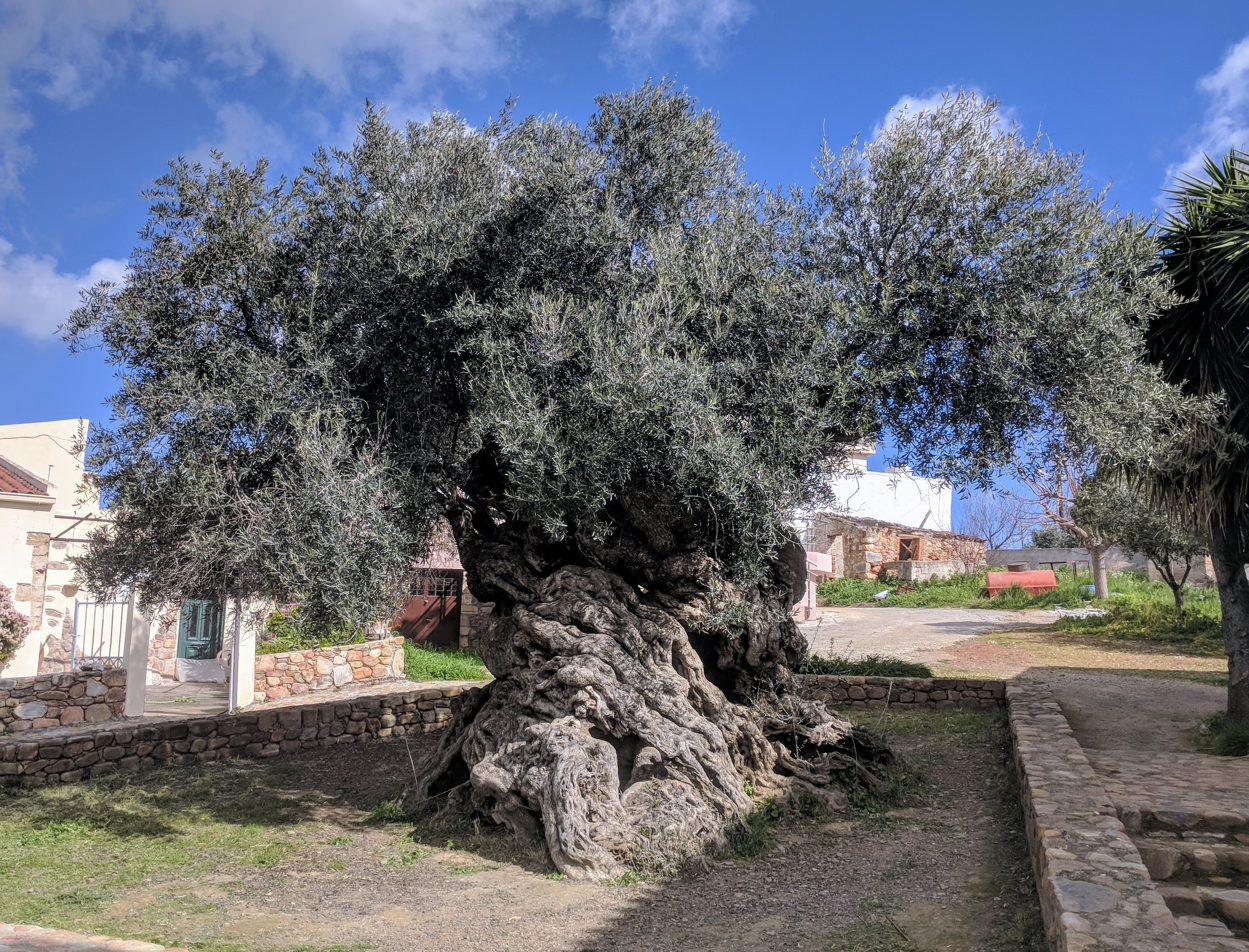
The Olive tree of Vouves in 2018

The Olive tree of Vouves (Greek: Ελιά Βουβών) is an olive tree in the village of Ano Vouves in the municipal unit of Kolymvari in Chania regional unit, Crete, Greece. Probably one of the oldest olive trees in the world, it still produces olives today.

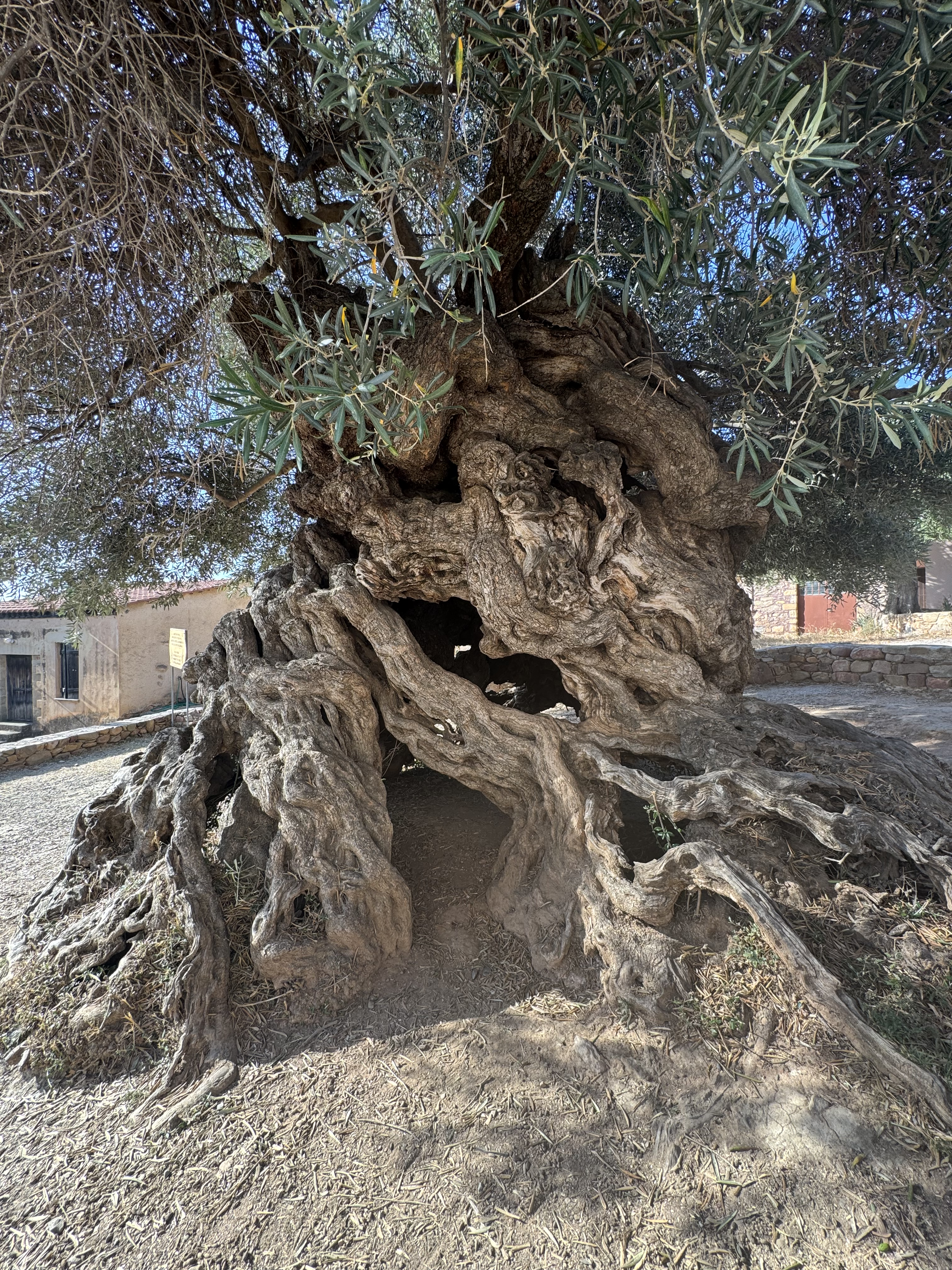
A close up of the trunk of the ancient Olive Tree of Vouves, showing its empty trunk

The exact age of the tree cannot be determined. The use of radioisotopes is not possible, as its heartwood has been lost down the centuries, while tree ring analysis demonstrated the tree to be at least 2,000 years old. On the other end of the scale, scientists from the University of Crete have estimated it to be 4,000 years old. A possible indicator of its age are the two cemeteries from the Geometric Period discovered near the tree. Current research in Crete and abroad indicates that earlier estimates of the age of olive trees are to be debated as far as their accuracy. There is not yet an agreed upon scientific method to ascertain the age of olive trees. In the case of the Vouves Olive, it could be much younger than earlier estimates or even older than the ancient tree in Finix (Sfakia).

The tree remains productive to this day, having been grafted with the cultivar 'Tsounati'. The trunk has a perimeter of 12.5 m (41 ft) and a diameter of 4.6 m (15 ft).

In 1997, the tree was declared a protected natural monument, and in October 2009, the Olive Tree Museum of Vouves was inaugurated in a nearby 19th-century house, displaying the traditional tools and process of olive cultivation. Branches from the tree were used to weave victors' wreaths for the winners of the 2004 Athens Olympics and the 2008 Beijing Olympics.

== See also ==
- List of individual trees
- List of long-living organisms
- List of oldest trees
- Olive Tree of Mouchão
- Stara Maslina
