= Jurupa Oak =

Exceptionally old clonal oak colony in Riverside, California

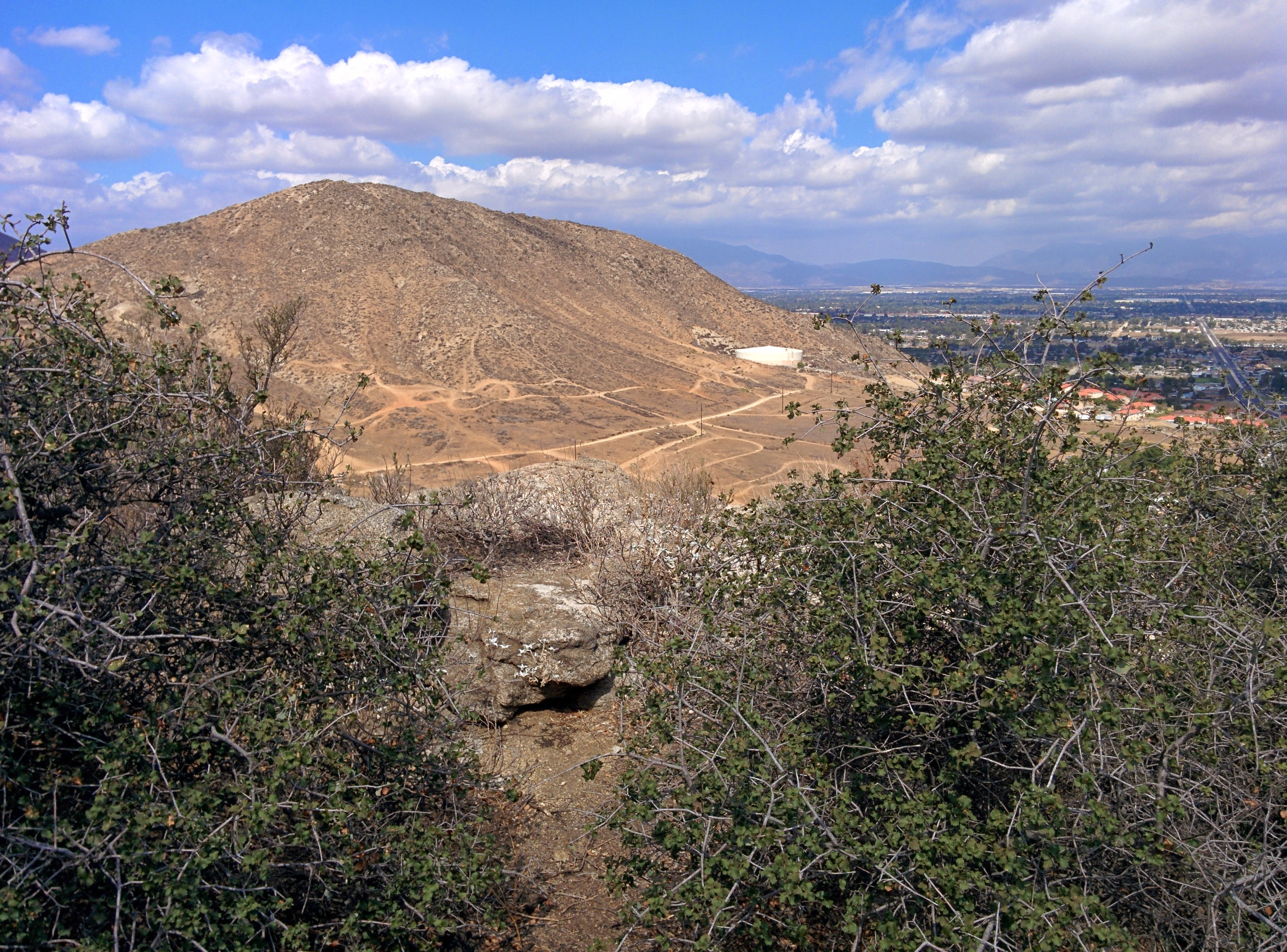
Jurupa Oak / Palmer's oak (on the right is tagged #1)

The Jurupa Oak, or Hurungna Oak, is a clonal colony of Quercus palmeri (Palmer's oak) trees in the Jurupa Mountains in Crestmore Heights, Riverside County, California. The colony has survived an estimated 13,000 years through clonal reproduction, making it one of the world's oldest living trees. The oak was discovered by botanist Mitch Provance in the 1990s and at the time he recognized it as disjunct for the species and likely an "ancient" clonal stand.

The colony only grows after wildfires, when its burned branches sprout new shoots. It is the only one of its species in the surrounding area, which is a much drier climate and lower altitude than that in which Palmer's oaks typically grow. The oak has roughly 70 clusters of stems in a thicket which measures 25 m × 8 m (82 ft × 26 ft) in area and one meter in height.

The colony is located within a mile of 34.033°N 117.391°W at an elevation of approximately 1,312 ft (400 m) on a relatively steep north-facing slope.

On September 5, 2024, the city council of Jurupa Valley, California, approved in a 3-2 vote a plan to build a mixed development on 1.4 square miles (3.6 km^{2}) that includes 1,700 homes and a light industrial park, within 550 feet (170 m) of the Jurupa Oak. As of May 12, 2026, an agreement was reached between conservation groups and Southern California developers to increase the buffer to 1,000 feet (300 m)

== See also ==
- Jurupa etymology
- List of longest-living organisms
- List of oldest trees – List of longest living trees
- List of individual trees
- King Clone – Ancient clonal colony of creosote bush in the Mojave Desert
