= The Senator (tree) =

Biggest and oldest bald cypress tree in the world until 2012

The Senator Tree
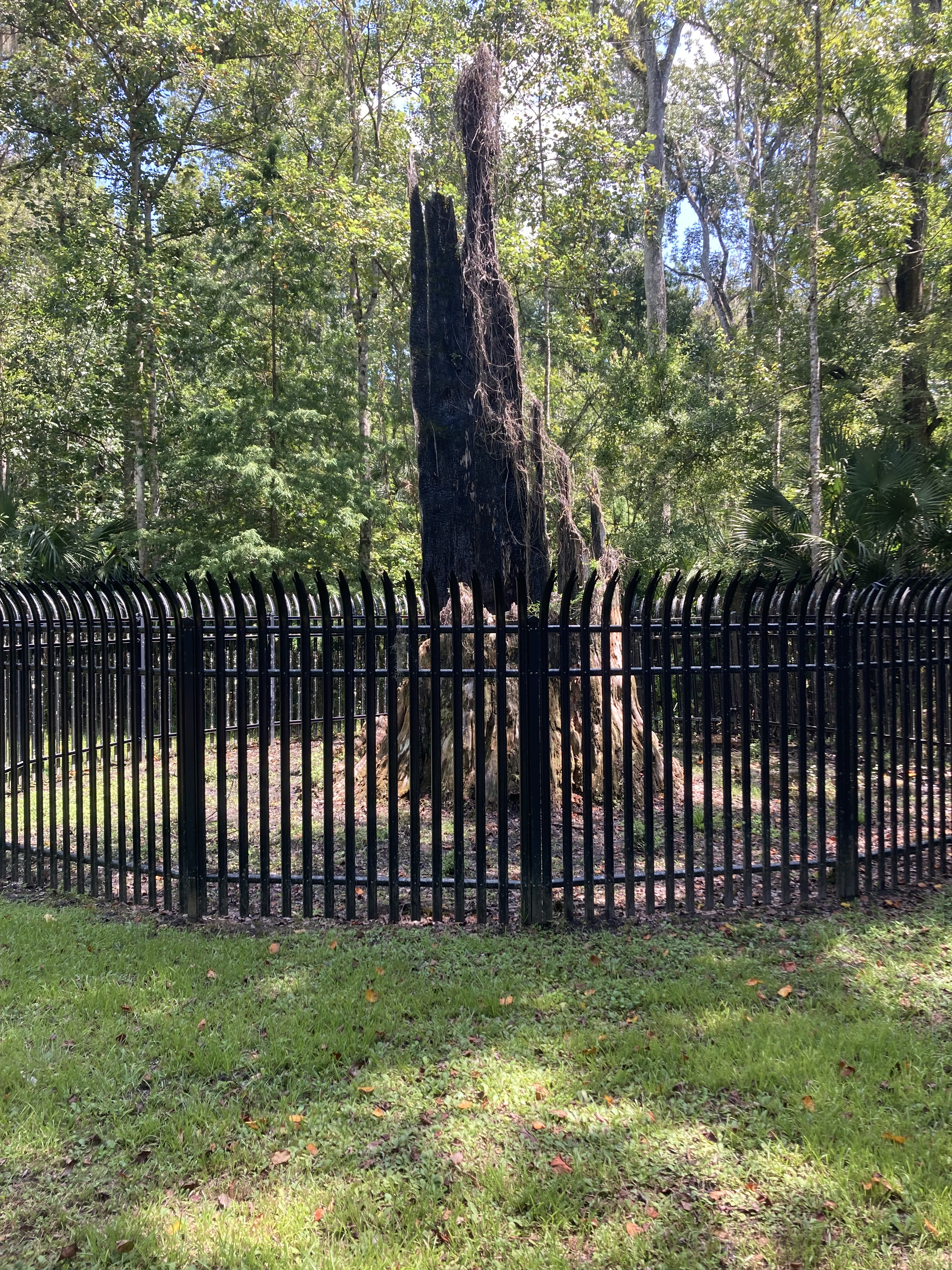
- Remains of The Senator in 2021

- Location within Florida
- Species: Bald cypress (Taxodium distichum)
- Location: Longwood, Florida
- Coordinates: 28°43′11.2″N 81°19′52.65″W
- Date seeded: c. 1550 BCE
- Date felled: January 16, 2012

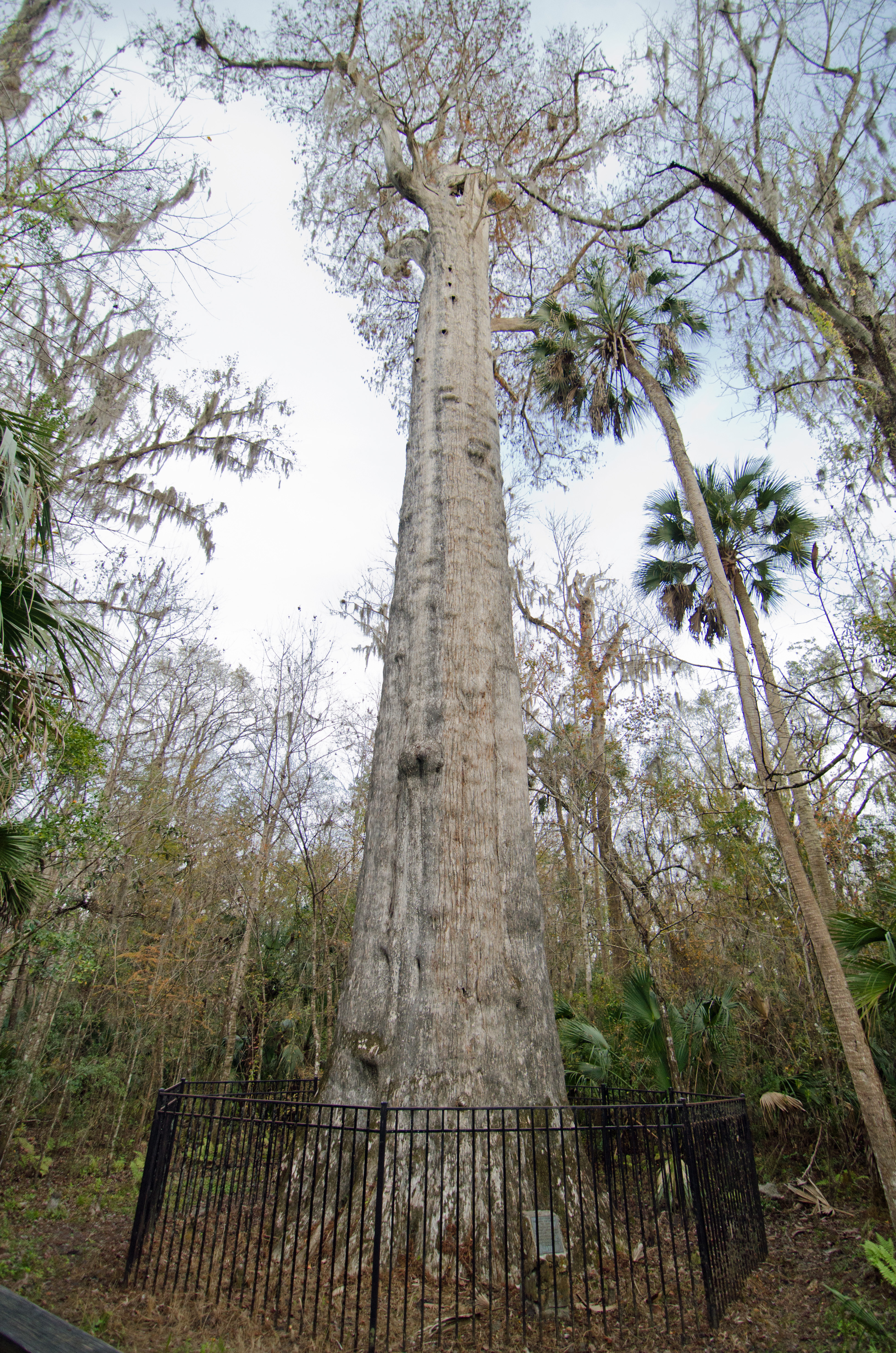
The Senator in 2012

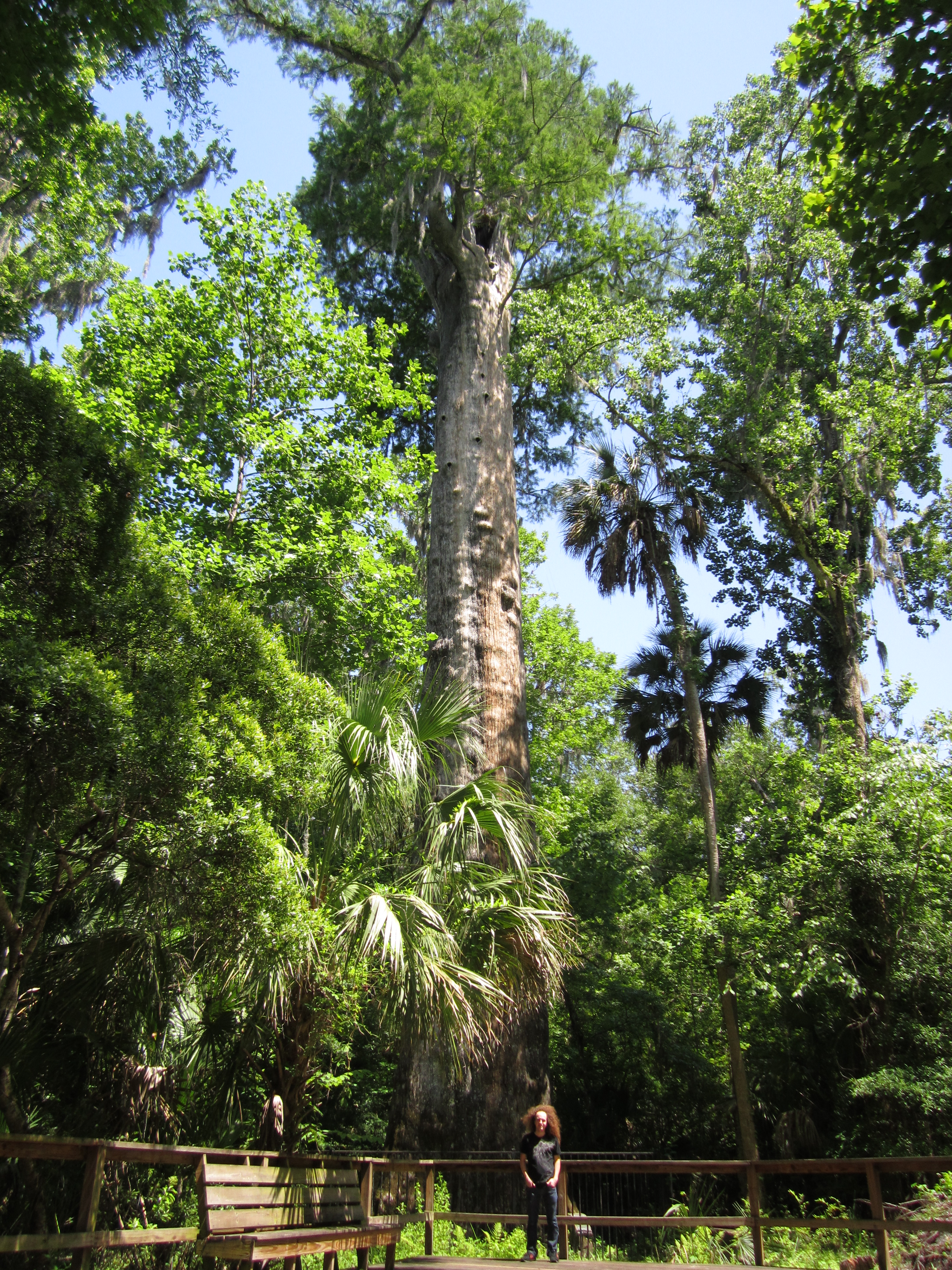
The Senator in 2011

The Senator was the biggest and oldest bald cypress tree in the world, located in Big Tree Park, Longwood, Florida. At the time of its demise in 2012, it was approximately 3,500 years old, 125 feet (38 m) tall, and with a trunk diameter of 11.27 feet (3.44 m). In January 2012, the tree was killed when a local meth addict started a garbage fire inside the hollow trunk so she could see the crystal meth she was trying to smoke.

== Background ==
As of 1993, the Senator was estimated to be 3,500 years old, making it the 12th oldest tree in the world. The tree's volume had previously been estimated at 4,300 cubic feet (120 m^{3}), but a 2006 survey by Will Blozan of the Native Tree Society has measured the volume at well over 5,100 cubic feet (140 m^{3}), making The Senator not only the largest Bald Cypress in the United States, but also the largest tree of any species east of the Mississippi River.

== History ==
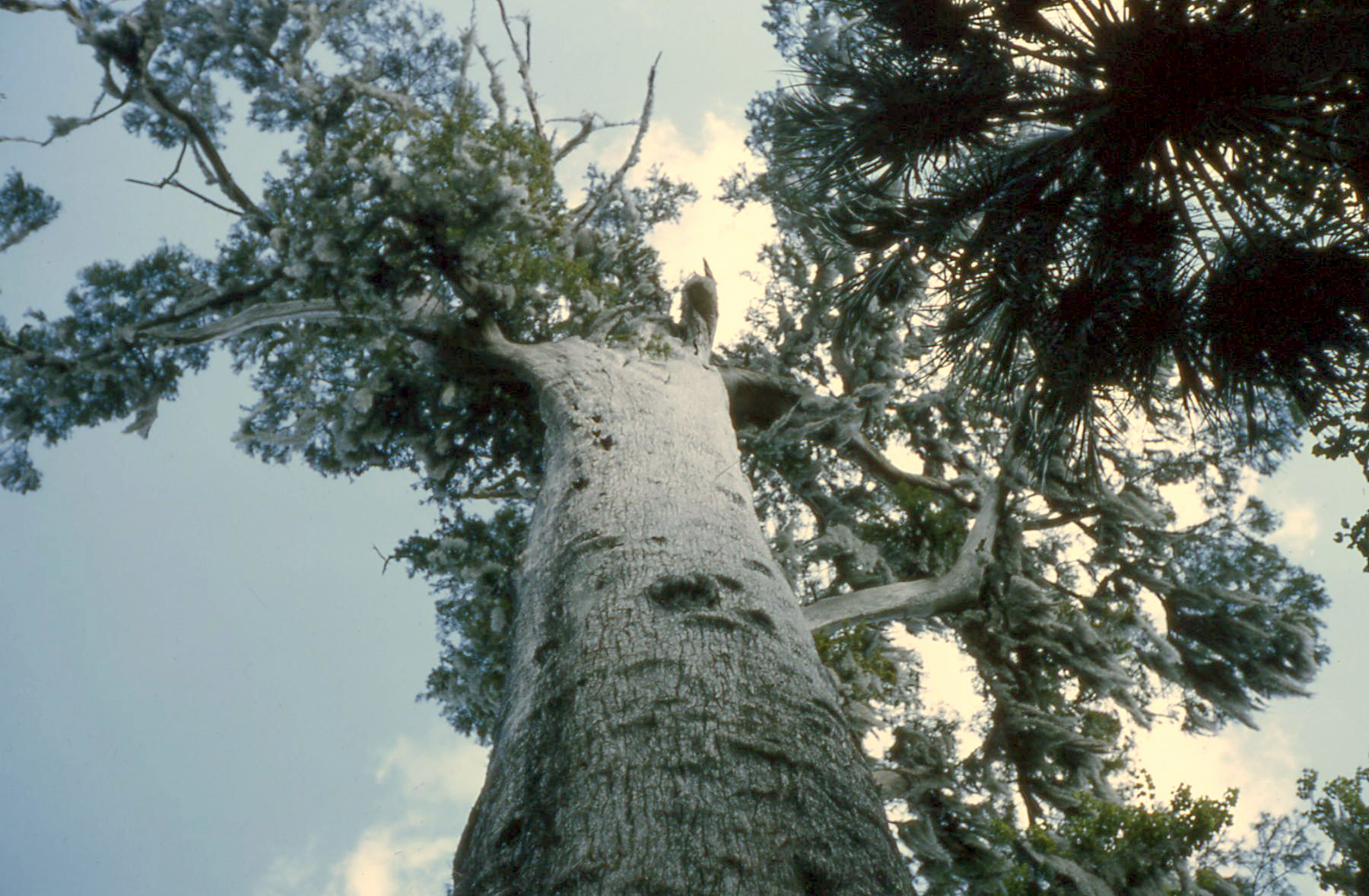
Looking up from the base of The Senator, 1967

The Seminoles and other Native American groups who lived throughout Central Florida used this tree as a landmark. In the late 19th century, the tree attracted visitors even though much of the surrounding land was swamp; reaching the tree was done by leaping from log to log. A walkway was later constructed by the Works Progress Administration. In 1925, a hurricane destroyed the top of the tree, reducing its height from 165 feet (50 m) to 126 feet (38 m).

The Senator was named for Florida State Senator Moses Overstreet, who donated the tree and surrounding land to Seminole County for a park in 1927. In 1929, former US President Calvin Coolidge reportedly visited The Senator and dedicated the site with a commemorative bronze plaque. A photo that was published of Coolidge and his wife near the tree was reported by the Orlando Sentinel to have been doctored. The plaque and portions of an iron fence were stolen by vandals in 1945 and never recovered.

=== Fire and collapse ===
On January 16, 2012, a fire was reported at the top of the Senator tree, which burned from the inside out, "like a chimney." Firefighters arrived to try to extinguish the blaze, but the tree collapsed. The charred remains of the tree now stand only 20 to 25 feet (6.1 to 7.6 m) tall.

On February 28, 2012, the Florida Division of Forestry said they arrested a 26-year-old woman on suspicion of starting the Senator fire. The suspect stated that she regularly went to the tree site when the park was closed. On the night of January 16, 2012, she lit a fire with debris so that she could see the crystal meth that she was trying to smoke but the fire got out of control. Officials said that they found images of the fire being started on the woman's laptop and on her cellphone. Following a plea agreement resulting in a suspended sentence, she was sentenced to prison for 30 months for violation of probation in 2016.

=== Post-fire ===
In October 2013, Seminole County officials allowed a small, select group of artists and woodworkers to create works of art for the county from the charred remains of the Senator. Artisans have created a variety of items, including vases, pens, ornate flutes, and sculptures. Some of the items have been made available for sale at art shows, and officials are working toward making both a permanent and traveling exhibit with some of the artifacts.

On March 2, 2014, Big Tree Park was re-opened to the public after being closed for almost a year after the fire that destroyed The Senator. A memorial was constructed which includes signage along the newly renovated boardwalk, a playground piece that mimics a bald cypress tree stump and a clone of The Senator that was planted near the playground. The name for the clone is "The Phoenix".

A clone of the Senator was located, and currently is growing at the entrance to Big Tree Park. The clone was provided by Marvin Buchanan. Buchanan had secured some branches after the Senator suffered wind damage and cloned it on his tree farm.

== Lady Liberty Tree ==
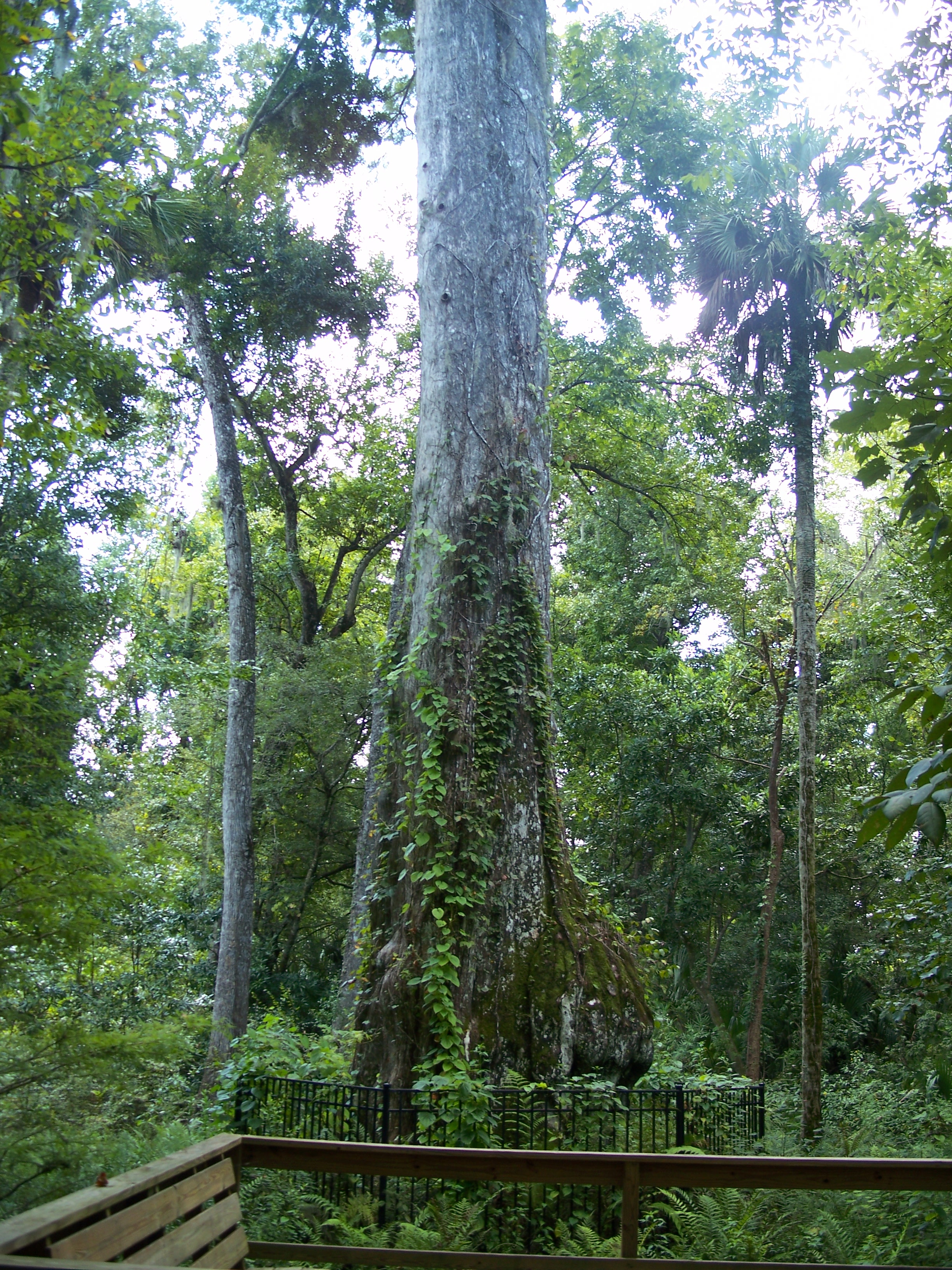
Lady Liberty in 2007.

Located 40 feet (12 m) from where The Senator stood is another old cypress in the same Big Tree Park named Lady Liberty that was named companion tree to The Senator. It is 89 feet (27 m) high 10 feet (3.0 m) in diameter, is estimated to be 2,000 years old and is another one of the oldest trees in the world.

== See also ==
- List of oldest trees
- List of individual trees
