= Olive Tree of Mouchão =

Tree in Mouriscas, Portugal

Coordinates: 39°28′23.59″N 8°04′51.41″W

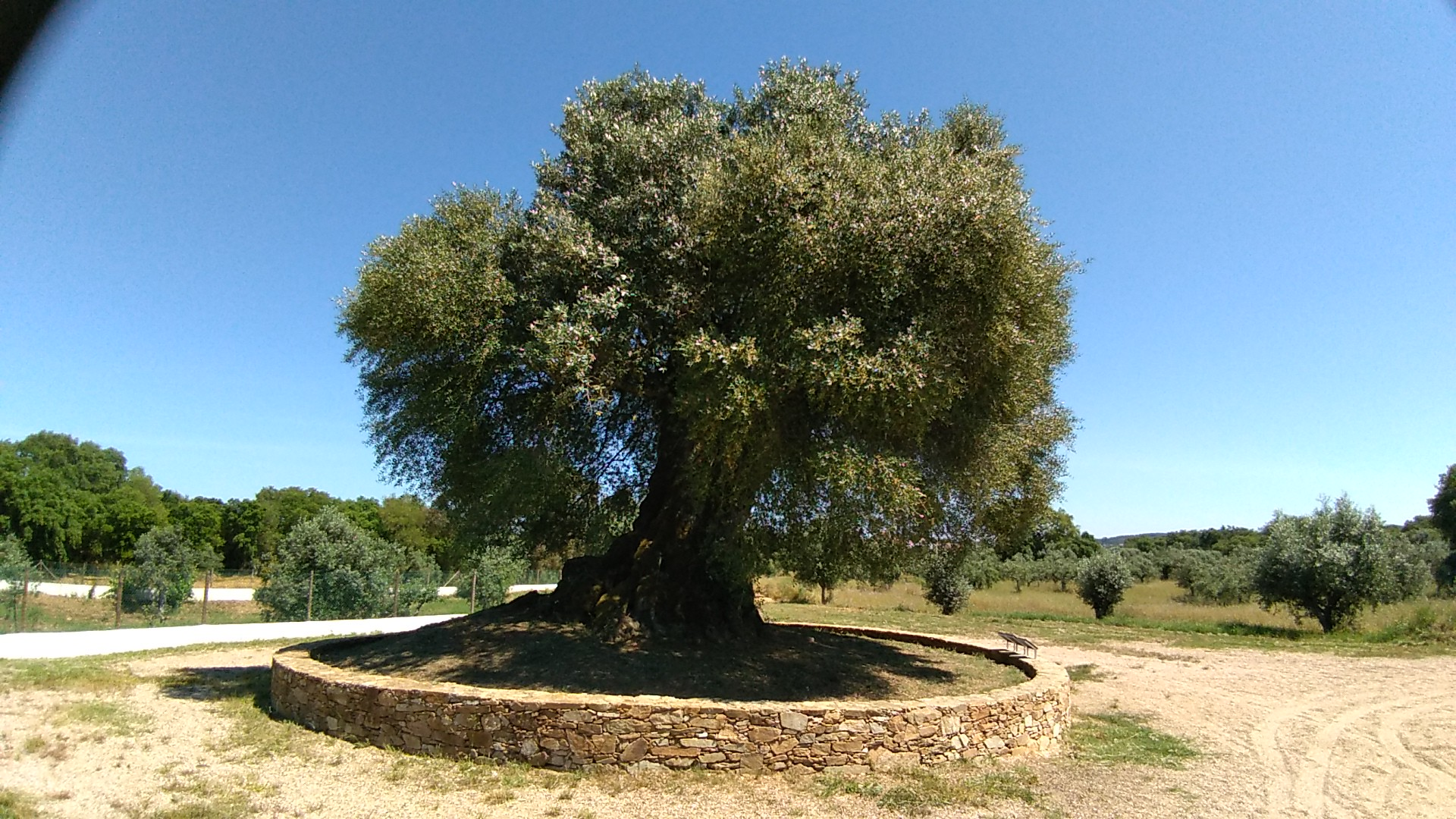
- Interactive map of Olive Tree of Mouchão
- Species: Olea europaea
- Location: Mouriscas, Portugal
- Height: 10 m (33 ft)
- Date seeded: About 1325 BCE

The Olive Tree of Mouchão (Portuguese: Oliveira do Mouchão) is a tree of the species Olea europaea, considered a Tree of Public Interest since 2007. It is located in the parish of Mouriscas, a municipality of Abrantes, Portugal, north of the Tagus River. It came in second place for the Tree of the Year in both 2020 and 2021.

== Overview ==
The Olive tree of Mouchão is one of the oldest olive trees in the world, being approximately 3350 years old. Despite the age, the tree still produces olives. The tree is specifically of a Galician type of olive tree, but has since been grafted with a wild olive tree. The tree's trunk is hollowed out, and is cut off a little over three meters above the ground. The average perimeter of the tree at breast height is about 652 centimeters. While the average perimeter at the stump is about 1,112 centimeters. The stem height is 320 centimeters. The whole tree is about 10 meters tall and has a trunk about 5 meters in circumference. The tree is covered in gnarled branches and reportedly is home to a colony of bats.

== Age ==
In 2016, José Luís Lousada, a researcher at the University of Trás-os-Montes and Alto Douro, estimated the tree's age at approximately 3,350 years old using dendrometry—the measurement of tree dimensions such as trunk diameter. However, dendrometry alone cannot determine the precise age of a tree, especially in ancient olive trees where internal hollowing and variable growth rates complicate direct measurement. According to this assessment with an estimate age precision of 2%, it is considered the oldest tree in Portugal. It is additionally one of the oldest olive trees in the world, being planted during the Bronze Age and predating the start of written language in Iberia. Despite the long age, the tree still produces olives.

== Cultural significance ==
The tree has been identified as a Tree of Public Interest by ICNF, the Institute for the Conservation of Nature and Forests. It has been a finalist in the annual "Tree of the Year" contests. The tree is considered a public park and is surrounded by a stone wall. After it was studied and estimated at 3,350 years old, a stone wall was added around the base of the tree and the space around it was filled with fresh soil, covering some of the tree's roots which had since become exposed. Below the tree lies a granite slab with an excerpt from the book, Onde ("Where"), by José Luís Peixoto. There also exists a notice plaque at the base of the tree, which reads as follows,

It is certified that this Olive Tree, with an average perimeter at breast height of 652cm, an average perimeter of the stump of 1112cm, and a stem height of 320cm, is 3350 years old (margin of error 2%). This evaluation had as its base a study with data collected in the Alentejo region, carried out by a team of investigators from the Forestry Products Laboratory and the Modelling Unit of the Forestry Department of the University of Trás-os-Montes and Alto Douro (Vila Real – Portugal), according to the methodology described in the Portuguese Patent NP 104183.

— Câmara Municipal de Abrantes

== Etymology ==
Its name derives from mouchão fishing, since from the beginning of the 20th century, fishermen would gather at the tree before going fishing.

== See also ==
- Olive tree of Vouves
- Stara Maslina
- Millennial olive tree of Roquebrune Cap-Martin
- List of oldest trees
- List of individual trees
