= Snoegen =

Coordinates: 55°54′16.20″N 12°0′0.36″E

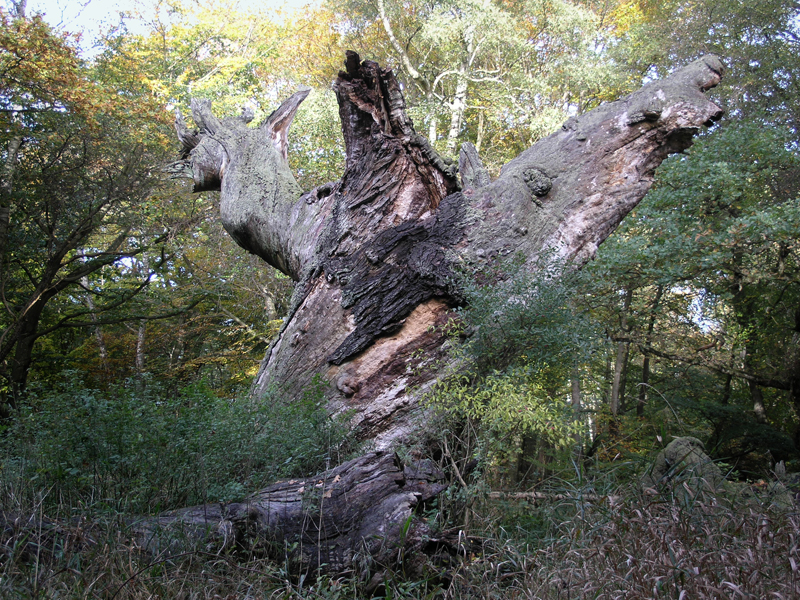
Snoegen

Snoegen was an ancient pedunculate oak located in Jægerspris Nordskov, near the town Jægerspris in Denmark. Snoegen is located in the same forest as Kongeegen and Storkeegen. Snoegen died in 1991 after a few seasons of decreasing foliage, and following works to erect a wooden barrier around the tree that may have damaged the root zone. The trunk still stands. Snoegen is named after the twisted trunk. The trunk had a perimeter of 8.90 meters in 1990.

It is estimated that the tree is between the 600 and 700 years old but there are also estimations who suggest an age between the 400 and 850 years.

== See also ==
- List of individual trees
