= Kongeegen =

Ancient oak tree in Denmark

Coordinates: 55°54′37″N 11°59′21″E

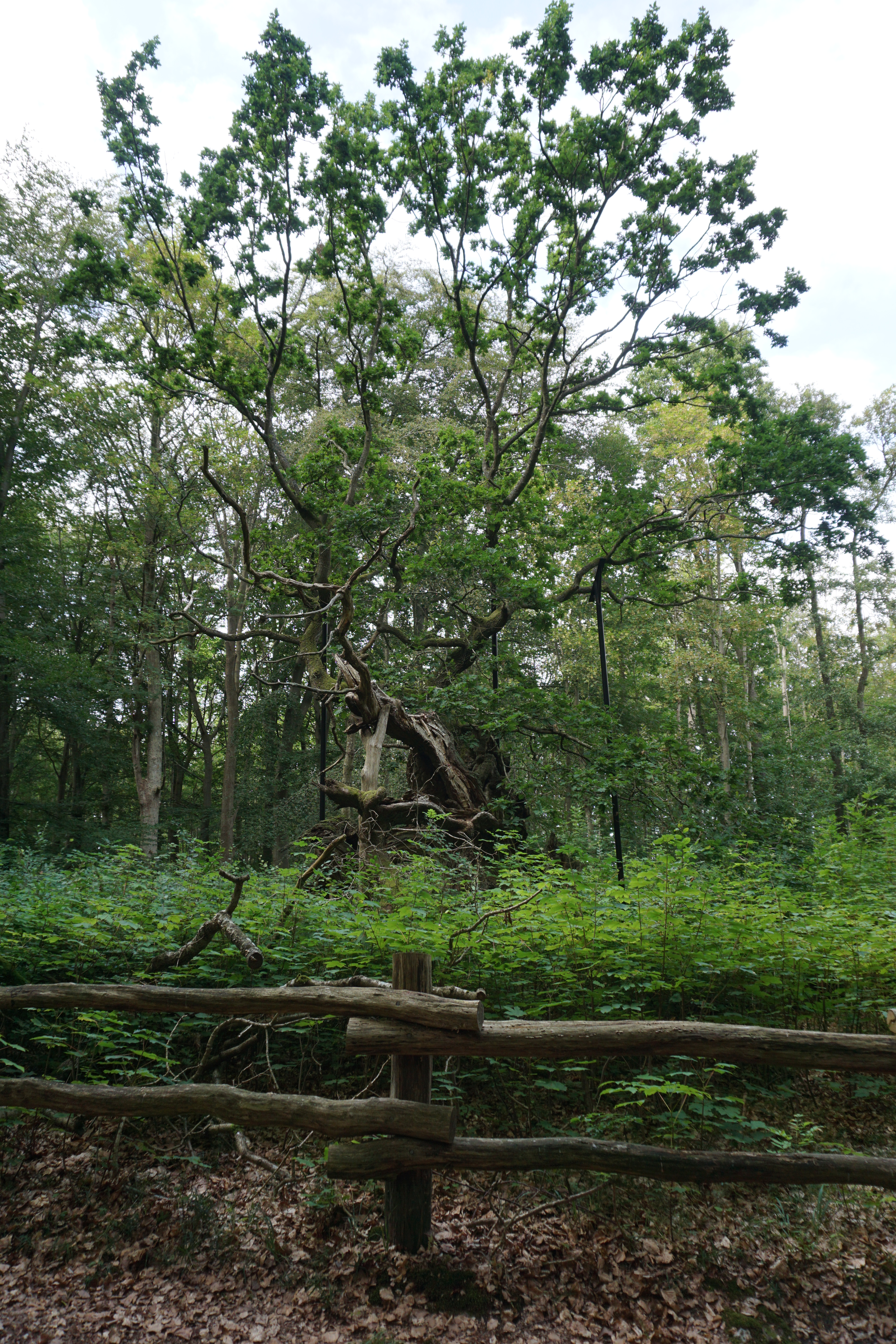
Kongeegen in August 2019

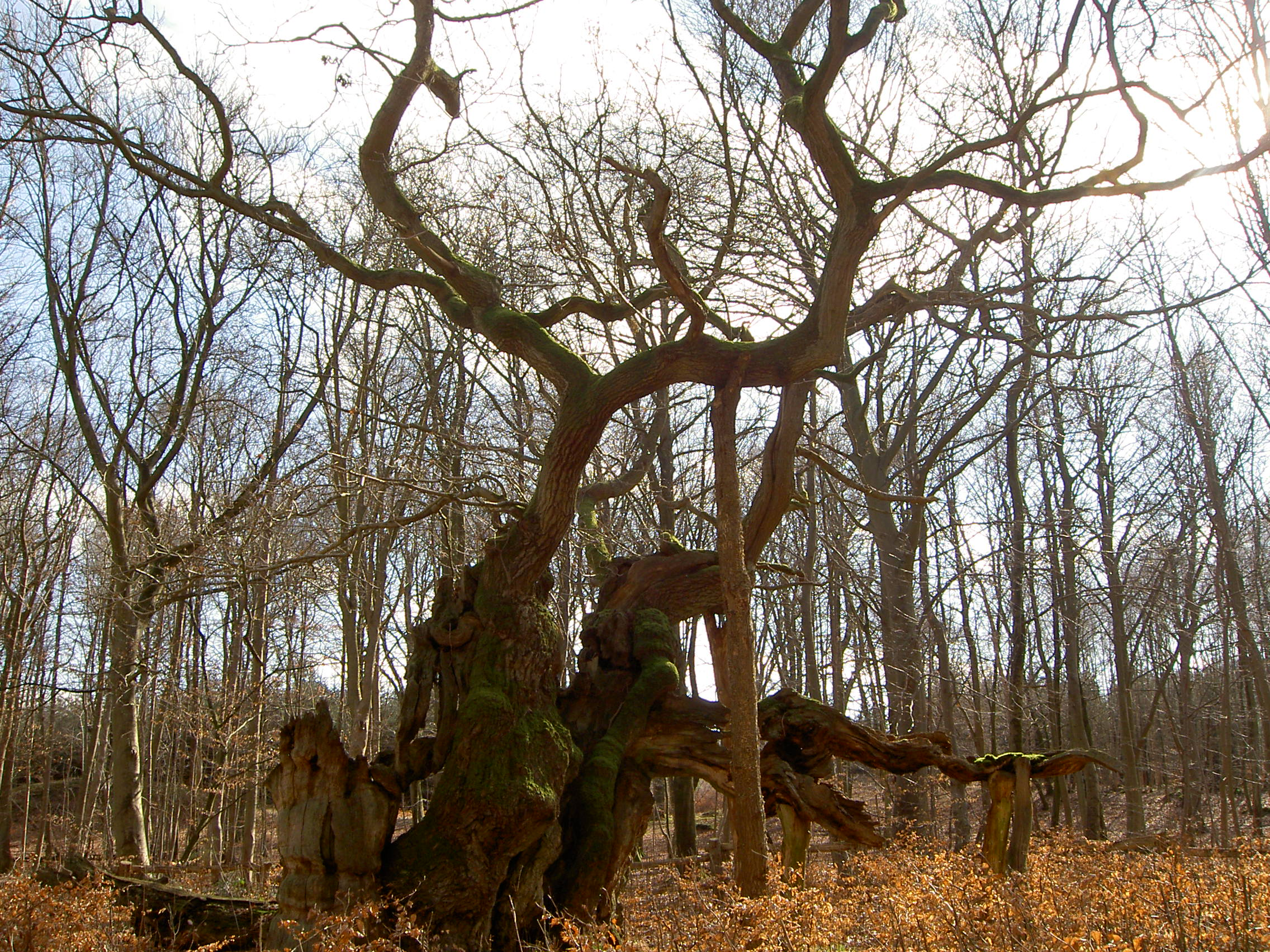
Kongeegen in March 2008

Kongeegen (the King Oak) is a renowned oak tree in Denmark. It grows in Jægerspris Nordskov (Jægerspris North Forest) near Jægerspris, on the island of Sjælland. A scientific investigation in 1965 of the tree's rings indicated that the tree has an estimated age of 1500–2000 years, and may well be the oldest living oak in northern Europe. It probably originally grew in an open meadow, to account for its short trunk and low branching, with other taller forest trees growing up around it subsequently. Kongeegen is located in the same forest as Snoegen and Storkeegen.

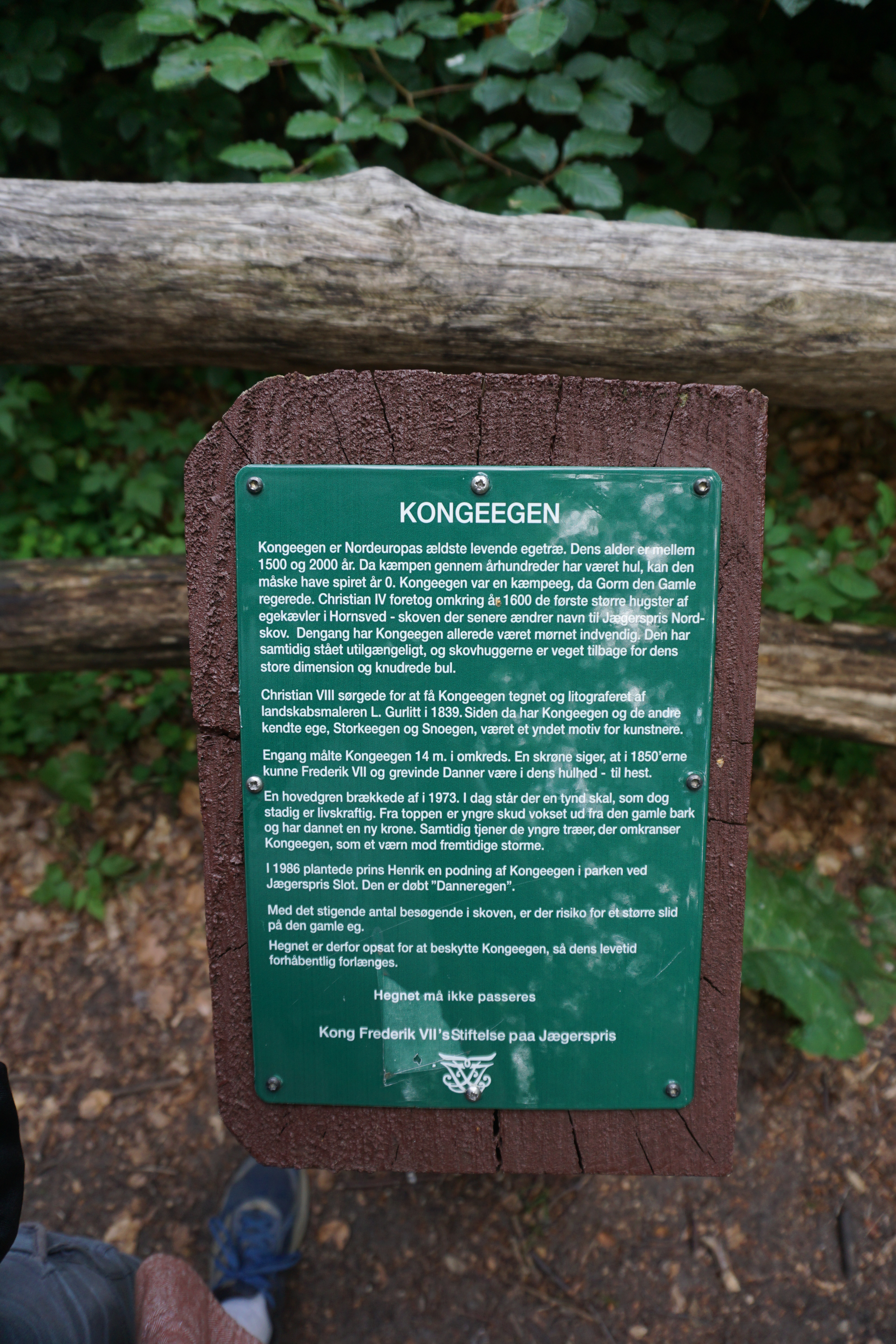
Kongeegen plaque written in Danish in August 2019

== See also ==
- List of individual trees
- List of oldest trees
