= Stara Maslina =

Monumental olive tree in Montenegro

Coordinates: 42°04′48″N 19°07′46″E

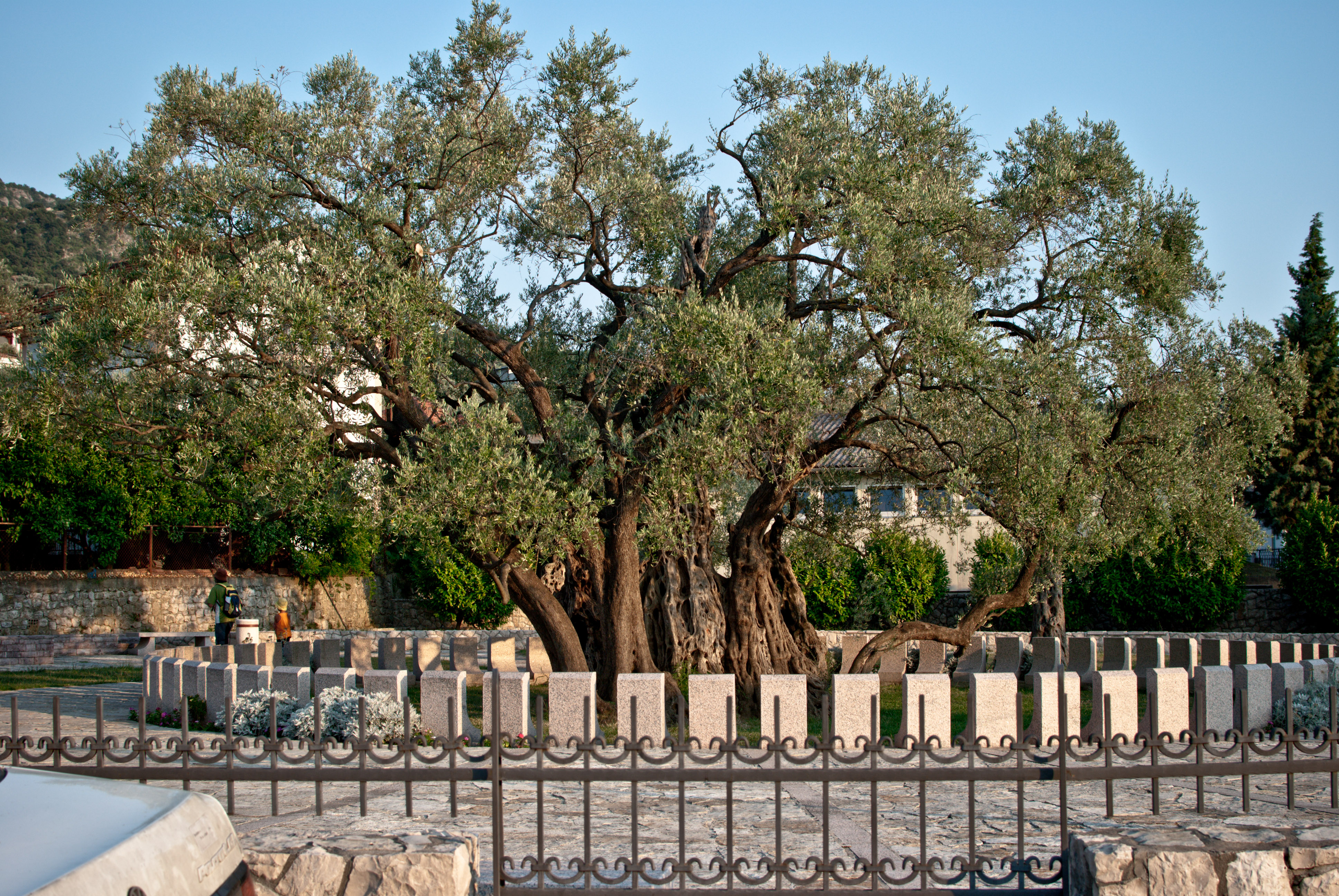
Stara Maslina

Stara maslina (Montenegrin Cyrillic: Стара маслина, English: Old Olive Tree) is one of the world's oldest olive trees, located near Stari Bar (City of Bar) in Montenegro. The tree is said to be over 2,000 years old. It is a popular tourist attraction in the country.

A side of the tree is completely burnt. According to popular folklore, a few men were playing cards next to the tree. During their game, one member accidentally threw a lit match onto the tree, and it soon went up in flames.

In 2023, the municipality discovered that parts of the tree were dying out, which prompted an expert commission to be formed to preserve the tree. As one of the fixes, a new water drainage system is being implemented.

== See also ==
- List of individual trees
- List of oldest trees
- Olive Tree of Mouchão
- Olive tree of Vouves
