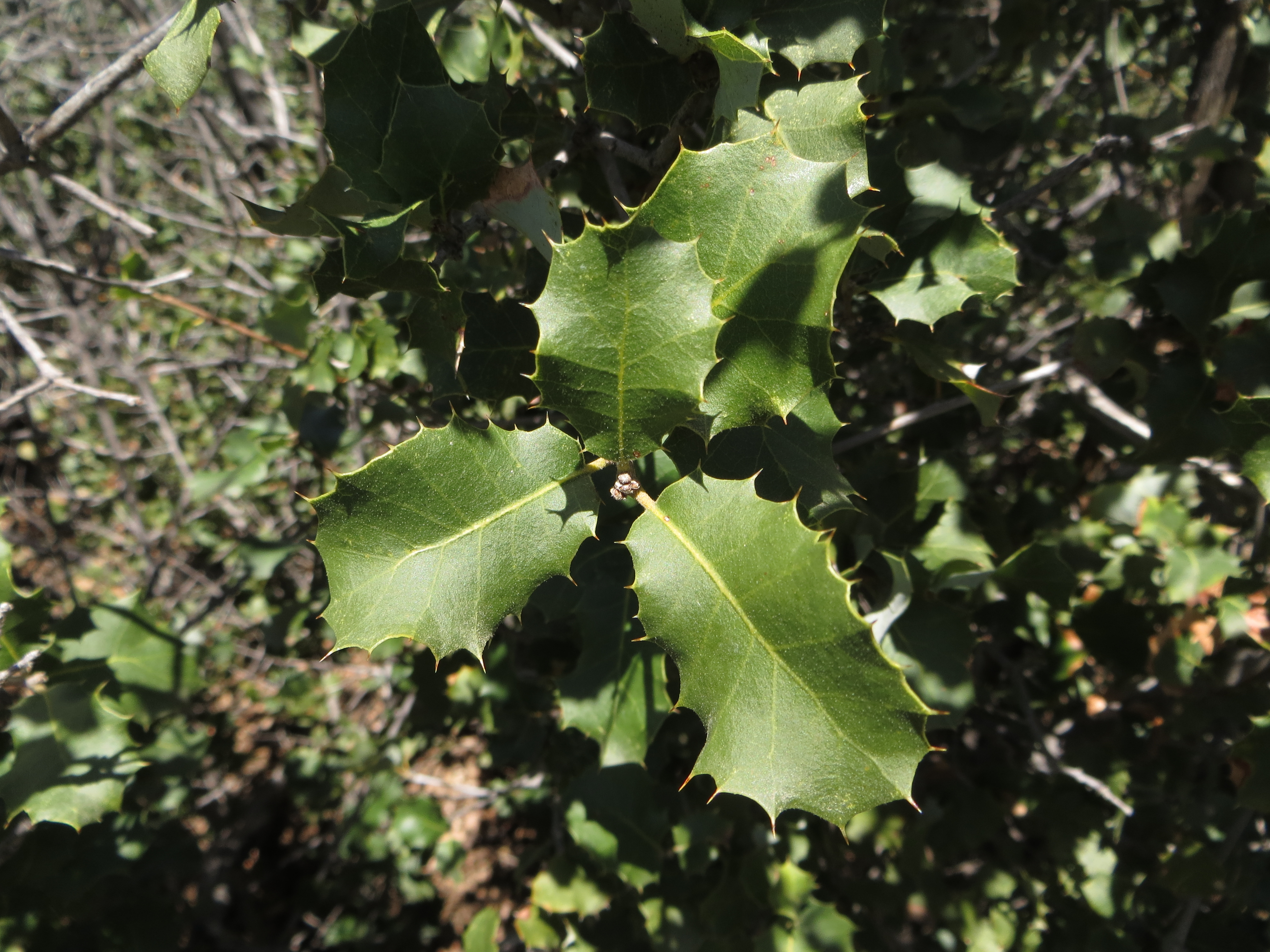

Conservation status
- Near Threatened (IUCN 3.1)

Scientific classification
- Kingdom: Plantae
- Clade: Embryophytes
- Clade: Tracheophytes
- Clade: Spermatophytes
- Clade: Angiosperms
- Clade: Eudicots
- Clade: Rosids
- Order: Fagales
- Family: Fagaceae
- Genus: Quercus
- Subgenus: Quercus subg. Quercus
- Section: Quercus sect. Protobalanus
- Species: Q. palmeri

Binomial name
- Quercus palmeri Engelm.
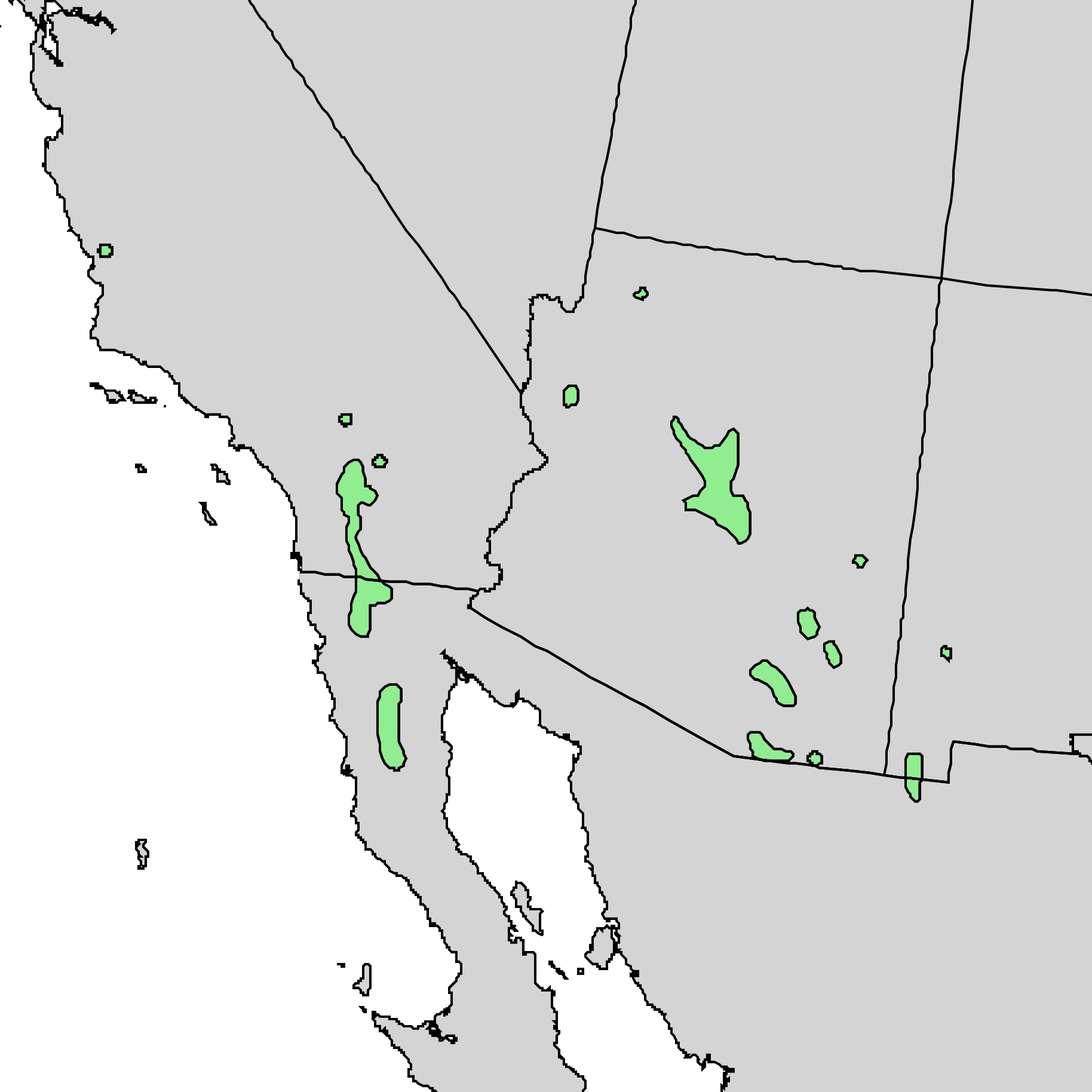
- Natural range of Quercus palmeri

Synonyms
- Quercus chrysolepis var. palmeri (Engelm.) Engelm.; Quercus dunnii Kellogg ex Curran

= Quercus palmeri =

Species of oak tree

Quercus palmeri is a species of oak known by the common name Palmer oak, or Palmer's oak. It is native to California (as far north as populations just south and east of the San Francisco Bay), Baja California, Southern Nevada, and in Arizona through the transition zone to the eastern Mogollon Rim, where it grows in canyons, mountain slopes, washes, and other dry habitats.

== Description ==
Quercus palmeri is a shrub or small tree growing 2–6 m (6 ft 7 in – 19 ft 8 in) in height. It branches into angular twigs and is reddish brown. The leaves are 1 to 3 centimetres (3/8 to 1 1/8 inches) in length. They are stiff, leathery, and brittle, their edges wavy with sharp spine-teeth. The upper surface is shiny, waxy, and olive green in color, the lower gray-green and coated with glandular hairs. The fruit is an acorn with a hairy cap up to 2.5 cm (1 in) wide and a blunt-ended nut 2 to 3 cm (3/4 to 1 1/4 in) long.

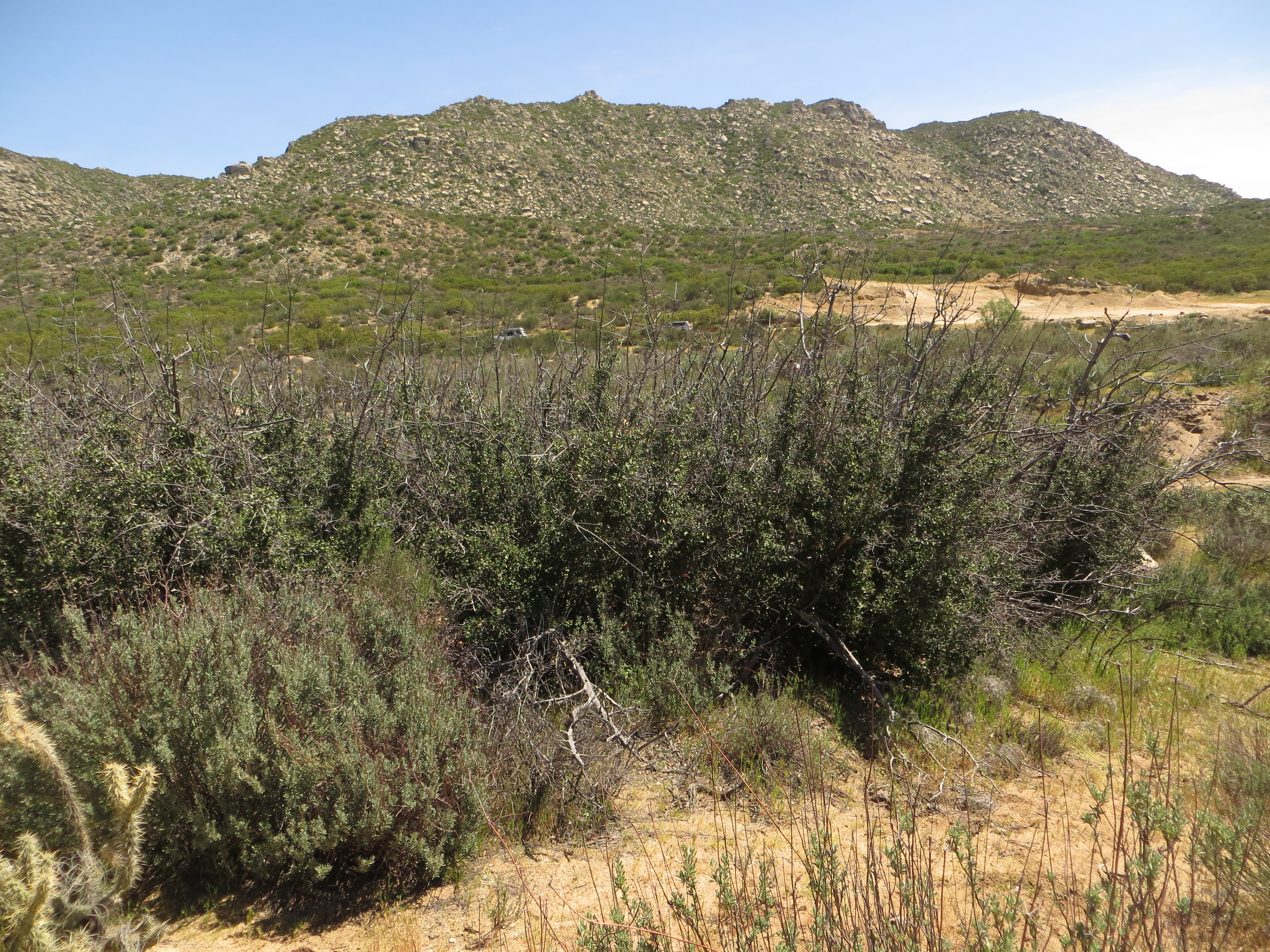
Cluster of clonal individuals

Quercus palmeri usually grows in small populations, some of which are actually all clones of a single plant. One such clone in the Jurupa Mountains in Riverside County, California, named the Jurupa Oak, was determined to be over 13,000 years old, a single individual living as a relict from the Pleistocene. It is therefore one of the oldest living plants in the world.

== Taxonomy ==
Quercus palmeri is placed in Quercus section Protobalanus.

Quercus dunnii Kellogg, common name Dunn oak, is synonymous with Palmer oak. Palmer oak does not occur in New Mexico; the specimens were misidentified and later corrected to Quercus grisea, per SEINet. Per FNA, the population of golden oaks in eastern Arizona appear to be introgressed Quercus chrysolepis and Q. palmeri, best called Q. chrysolepis aff. Q. palmeri. These populations of Q. chrysolepis demonstrate historical hybridization between Q. chrysolepis and Q. palmeri. Quercus palmeri was recently discovered in southern Nevada in Christmas Tree Pass that was previously only known from fossils.
