= Stelmužė =

Village in Lithuania

Coordinates: 55°49′39″N 26°13′11″E

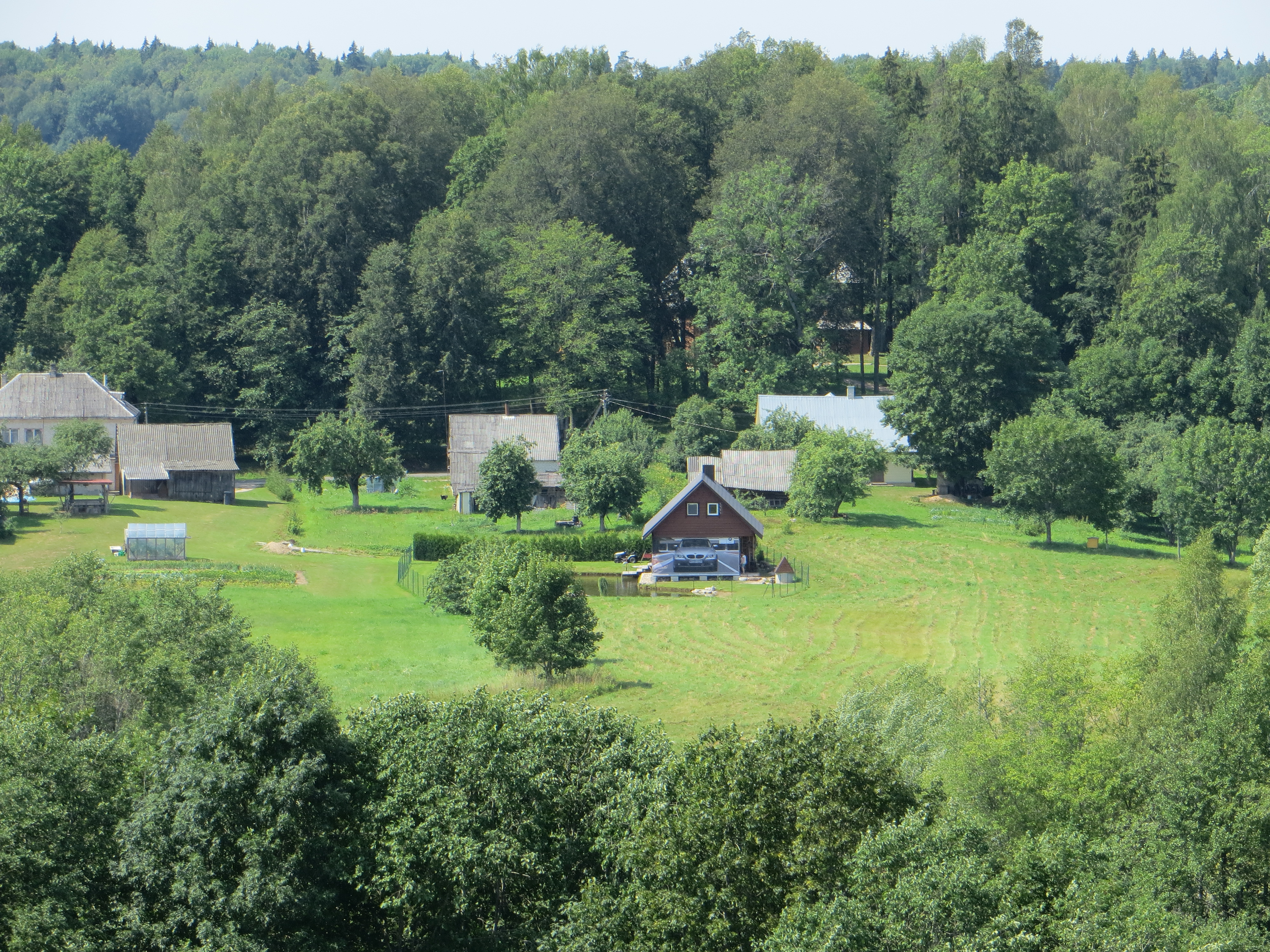
Stelmužė from the east

Stelmužė is a village in Zarasai district municipality of Lithuania. It is directly west of the border with Latvia.

There is a wooden chapel built in 1650 not using saws or iron nails; it is the oldest wooden religious building in Lithuania. Stelmužė is also known for the Tower of Slaves (Lithuanian: Vergų bokštas), a rectangular building constructed of stone and bricks in the 18th century, used for imprisonment of serfs. It was restored and registered as a 17th century architectural cultural monument.

The village is famous for its Stelmužė Oak, the oldest in Lithuania and one of the oldest in Europe. The oak is about one and a half thousand years old. It is often called the tree that is "older than Lithuania itself." It has been through a long range of historical events, having had sacrifices by pagan priests conducted under it and a skeleton and rifle of a Napoleonic soldier found in its cavity.

It was nominated for Tree of the Year in 2017, receiving 12th place and 5,245 votes.

== Gallery ==
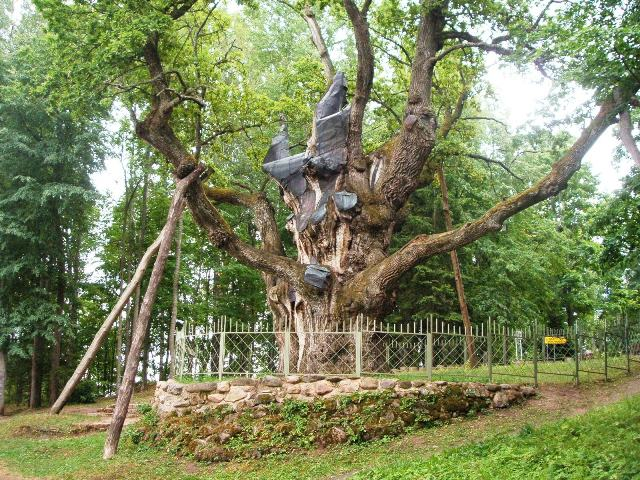
Stelmužė Oak

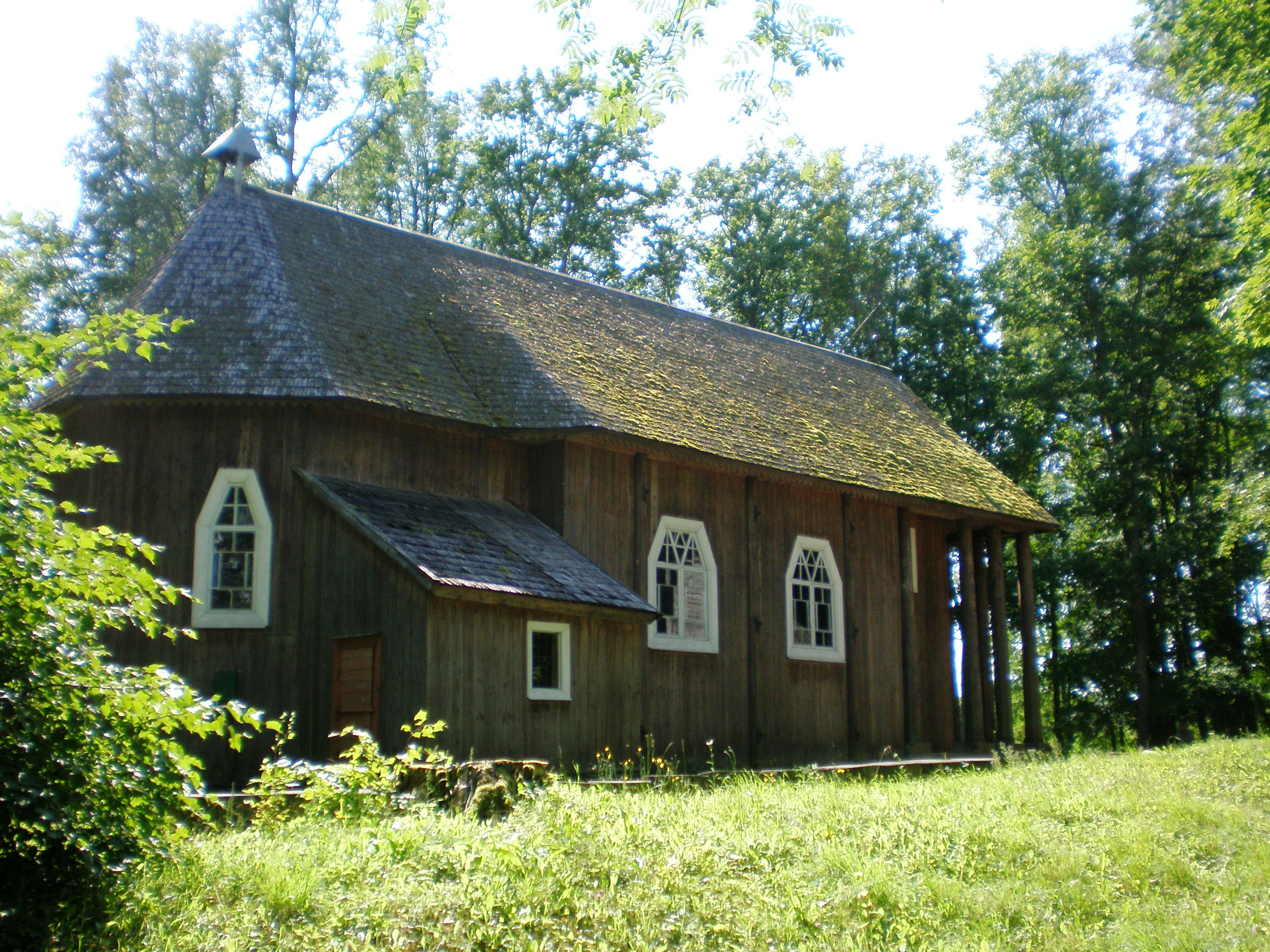
Stelmužė church

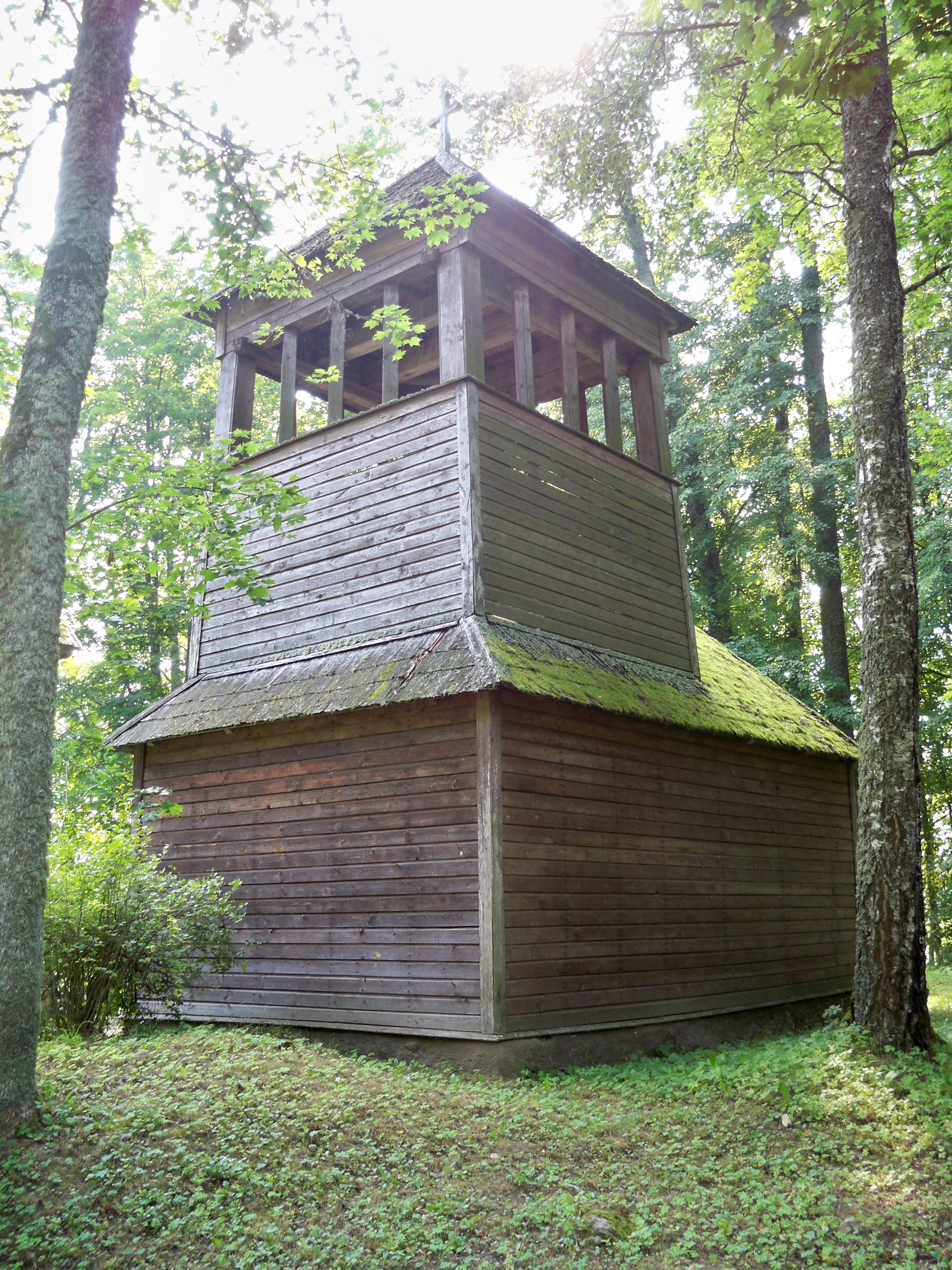
Stelmužė church belltower

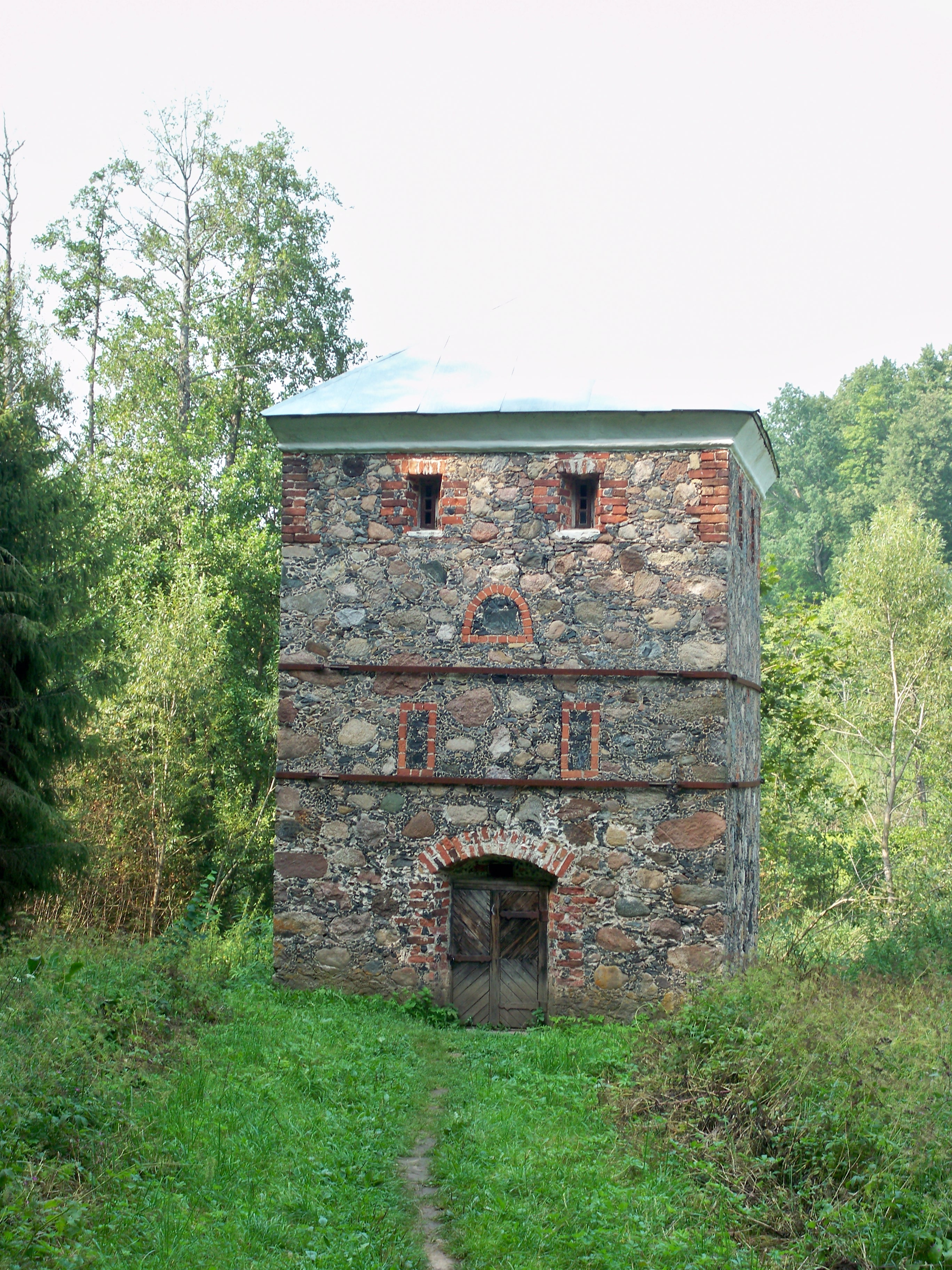
Stelmužė Tower of Slaves

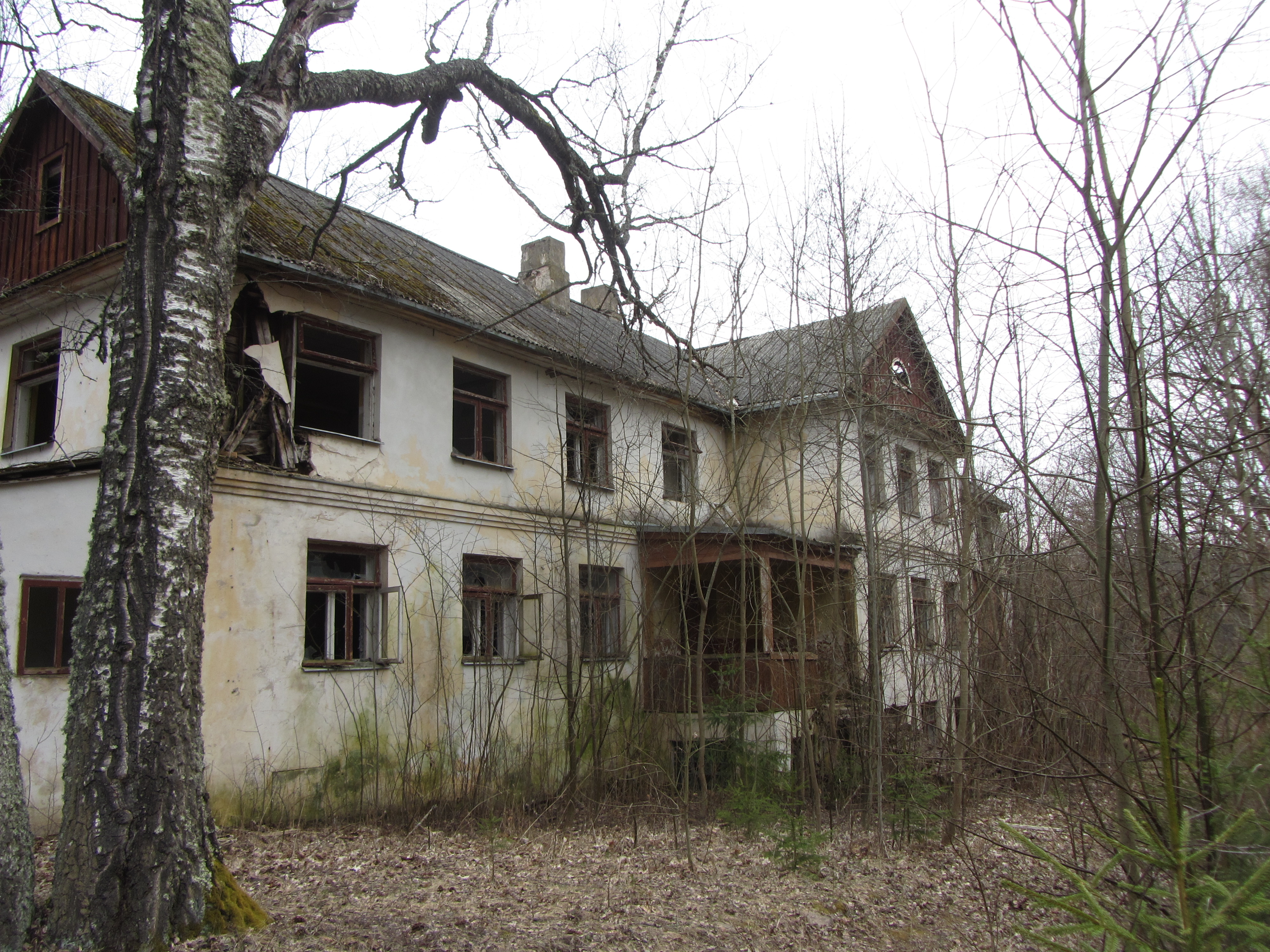
Stelmužė manor
