= List of elm trees =

Notable elm trees

Many elm (Ulmus) trees of various kinds have attained great size or otherwise become particularly noteworthy; among these are the following.

== American elm Ulmus americana ==
Most of North America's notable elms are Ulmus americana, a fast-growing and long-lived species capable of attaining great size in a few centuries, especially when open-grown. American Forests, a non-profit conservation organization, uses the following formula to calculate a point score for each tree to permit comparisons with others:

Trunk Circumference (in inches) + Height (in feet) + 1/4 Average Crown Spread (in feet) = Total Points

=== State champion American elm trees ===
The list of United States state champion American elm trees below tabulates each of the above characteristics, as well as the total points awarded to each tree.

State	Location	Circumference	Height	Average crown spread	Total points	Year	Ref.
Alabama	Walker County	194 inches (490 cm)	92 feet (28 m)	84 feet (26 m)	307	2018	
Arkansas	On the east side of Arkansas Highway 77 just east of the intersection of Highway 77 and Arkansas Highway 136, two miles north of Athelstan (intersection of Arkansas Highway 140 and Highway 77), Mississippi County	251 inches (640 cm)	112 feet (34 m)	107 feet (33 m)	390		
California	San Jose, Santa Clara County	173 inches (440 cm)	89 feet (27 m)	68 feet (21 m)	279	2015	
Colorado	Denver	205.67 inches (522.4 cm)	110 feet (34 m)	107 feet (33 m)	342.42		
Colorado	Olney Springs, Crowley County	208.18 inches (528.8 cm)	97 feet (30 m)	82 feet (25 m)	325.68		
Colorado	Fort Collins, Larimer County	194.68 inches (494.5 cm)	96 feet (29 m)	95 feet (29 m)	314.43		
Colorado	Fort Morgan, Morgan County	209.12 inches (531.2 cm)	75 feet (23 m)	106 feet (32 m)	310.62		
Connecticut	Greenwich, Fairfield County	230 inches (580 cm)	106 feet (32 m)	98 feet (30 m)	360	2019	
Delaware	The Green, Dover, Kent County	226 inches (570 cm)	113 feet (34 m)	104 feet (32 m)	367		
Delaware	White Clay Creek State Park, Newark, New Castle County	213 inches (540 cm)	113 feet (34 m)	81 feet (25 m)	346		
Delaware	1191 Boyds Corner Road, Middletown, New Castle County	199 inches (510 cm)	75 feet (23 m)	125 feet (38 m)	305		
Florida	Duval County	192 inches (490 cm)	77 feet (23 m)	51.5 feet (15.7 m)	282	2016	
Georgia	Norcross, Gwinnett County	233 inches (590 cm)	80 feet (24 m)	125 feet (38 m)	344	2016	
Georgia	Atlanta, Fulton County	191 inches (490 cm)	91 feet (28 m)	125 feet (38 m)	313	2011	
Idaho	Emmett, Gem County	180 inches (460 cm)	98 feet (30 m)	88 feet (27 m)	300	1998	
Illinois	Edwardsville, Madison County	189.6 inches (482 cm)	114 feet (35 m)	103 feet (31 m)	329	2007	
Indiana	Parke County	245.6 inches (624 cm)	108 feet (33 m)	127 feet (39 m)	385.35		
Iowa	East of Liberal Arts Building, University of Iowa, Iowa City, Johnson County	194 inches (490 cm)	93 feet (28 m)	98.5 feet (30.0 m)	311.25		
Kentucky	Jackson, Breathitt County	224.5 inches (570 cm)	111 feet (34 m)	113.5 feet (34.6 m)	363.88	2011	
Louisiana (National champion)	Iberville Parish	324 inches (820 cm)	111 feet (34 m)	79 feet (24 m)	455	2010	
Maine	Yarmouth, Cumberland County (removed in 2010 due to Dutch elm disease)	244 inches (620 cm)	110 feet (34 m)	129 feet (39 m)	386	2006	
Massachusetts	Main Street, Old Deerfield, Franklin County (removed in 2017 due to Dutch elm disease)	230.4 inches (585 cm)	104.4 feet (31.8 m)	103.6 feet (31.6 m)	360.7	2016	
Massachusetts	Main Street — Bridge Lane, Hatfield, Hampshire County	204 inches (520 cm)	86 feet (26 m)	95 feet (29 m)	314	2016	
Michigan	6022 East O Avenue, Kalamazoo, Kalamazoo County	264 inches (670 cm)	110 feet (34 m)	122.5 feet (37.3 m)	405	2019	
Minnesota	Hennepin County near Minneapolis	228 inches (580 cm)	80 feet (24 m)	87 feet (27 m)	329.75	2010	
Missouri	Johnson County	236 inches (600 cm)	85 feet (26 m)	126 feet (38 m)	353		
Montana	Ravalli County	205 inches (520 cm)	74 feet (23 m)	83 feet (25 m)	300	2012	
Montana	Ravalli County	186 inches (470 cm)	95 feet (29 m)	65 feet (20 m)	297	2012	
Montana	Lewis and Clark County	182 inches (460 cm)	83 feet (25 m)	26 feet (7.9 m)	291	2019	
Nebraska	Near Idylwild Park in Lincoln, Lancaster County	222 inches (560 cm)	70 feet (21 m)	85 feet (26 m)	313.25	2019	
Nevada	Idlewild Park, Reno, Washoe County	127 inches (320 cm)	86 feet (26 m)	81 feet (25 m)	233		
New Hampshire	Dover, Strafford County	167 inches (420 cm)	100 feet (30 m)	84.5 feet (25.8 m)	288	2018	
New Jersey	Stevens Institute of Technology, Hoboken, Hudson County	207 inches (530 cm)	90 feet (27 m)	107 feet (33 m)	324		
New Jersey	Union County	178 inches (450 cm)	115 feet (35 m)	86 feet (26 m)	315		
New Mexico	Philmont Scout Ranch, near Cimarron, Colfax County	240 inches (610 cm)	79 feet (24 m)	91 feet (28 m)	342	2010	
New York	Fulton County	188 inches (480 cm)	140 feet (43 m)	200 feet (61 m)	353	2015	
North Carolina	Powellsville, Bertie County	229 inches (580 cm)	135 feet (41 m)	87 feet (27 m)	385		
North Dakota	1012 Ninth Street South, Fargo, Cass County	196 inches (500 cm)	87 feet (27 m)	98.5 feet (30.0 m)	308	2016	
North Dakota	Rose Street, Lisbon, Ransom County	211 inches (540 cm)	58 feet (18 m)	100 feet (30 m)	294	2016	
Ohio	Hamilton County	262 inches (670 cm)	101 feet (31 m)	83 feet (25 m)	383	2016	
Oklahoma	Pawhuska, Osage County	201 inches (510 cm)	66 feet (20 m)	90 feet (27 m)	290	2013	
Oregon		212 inches (540 cm)	120 feet (37 m)	83 feet (25 m)	353		
Pennsylvania	1 Jackson Street, Wellsboro, Tioga County	232 inches (590 cm)	108 feet (33 m)	115 feet (35 m)	369	2017	
Rhode Island	Providence	195 inches (500 cm)	95 feet (29 m)	88 feet (27 m)	312		
South Carolina	Richland County	272 inches (690 cm)	107 feet (33 m)	114 feet (35 m)	405		
South Carolina	Richland County	225 inches (570 cm)	121 feet (37 m)	105 feet (32 m)	372.25		
South Carolina	Oconee County	151 inches (380 cm)	99 feet (30 m)	80 feet (24 m)	270		
South Dakota	Lyman County, near Chamberlain, Brule County	201 inches (510 cm)	53 feet (16 m)	92 feet (28 m)	277		
Tennessee	Meeman-Shelby Forest State Park, Shelby County	277 inches (700 cm)	122 feet (37 m)	84 feet (26 m)	420	2001	
Texas	Grayson County	232 inches (590 cm)	75 feet (23 m)	116 feet (35 m)	336	2017	
Utah	195 South 100 East Street, Logan, Cache County	190 inches (480 cm)	98 feet (30 m)	84 feet (26 m)	309	2007	
Vermont	Saxtons River, Windam County	201 inches (510 cm)	124 feet (38 m)	110 feet (34 m)	352		
Virginia	Along the Potomac River in Great Falls, Fairfax County	240 inches (610 cm)	130 feet (40 m)	105 feet (32 m)	396	2015	
Virginia	200 N. George Washington Highway, Deep Creek, City of Chesapeake	252 inches (640 cm)	110 feet (34 m)	116 feet (35 m)	391	2018	
Washington		215 inches (550 cm)	105 feet (32 m)	99 feet (30 m)	345		
West Virginia	Near Rippon, Jefferson County	279 inches (710 cm)	102 feet (31 m)	70 feet (21 m)	398		
West Virginia	Near Linden, Roane County	219 inches (560 cm)	77 feet (23 m)	86 feet (26 m)	317		
Wisconsin	On Rock Road east of Greenwood Road, Outagamie County	228 inches (580 cm)	105 feet (32 m)	70 feet (21 m)	351	2004	
Wisconsin	1040 Terrace Drive, Elm Grove, Waukesha County	192 inches (490 cm)	135 feet (41 m)	79 feet (24 m)	346.75	2013	
Wisconsin	Street tree between 1284 and 1288 North 71st Street, east side of Hart Park, Wauwatosa, Milwaukee County	179 inches (450 cm)	145 feet (44 m)	87 feet (27 m)	345.75	2007	

=== Other lists of American elm trees ===
Other notable American elm trees include:

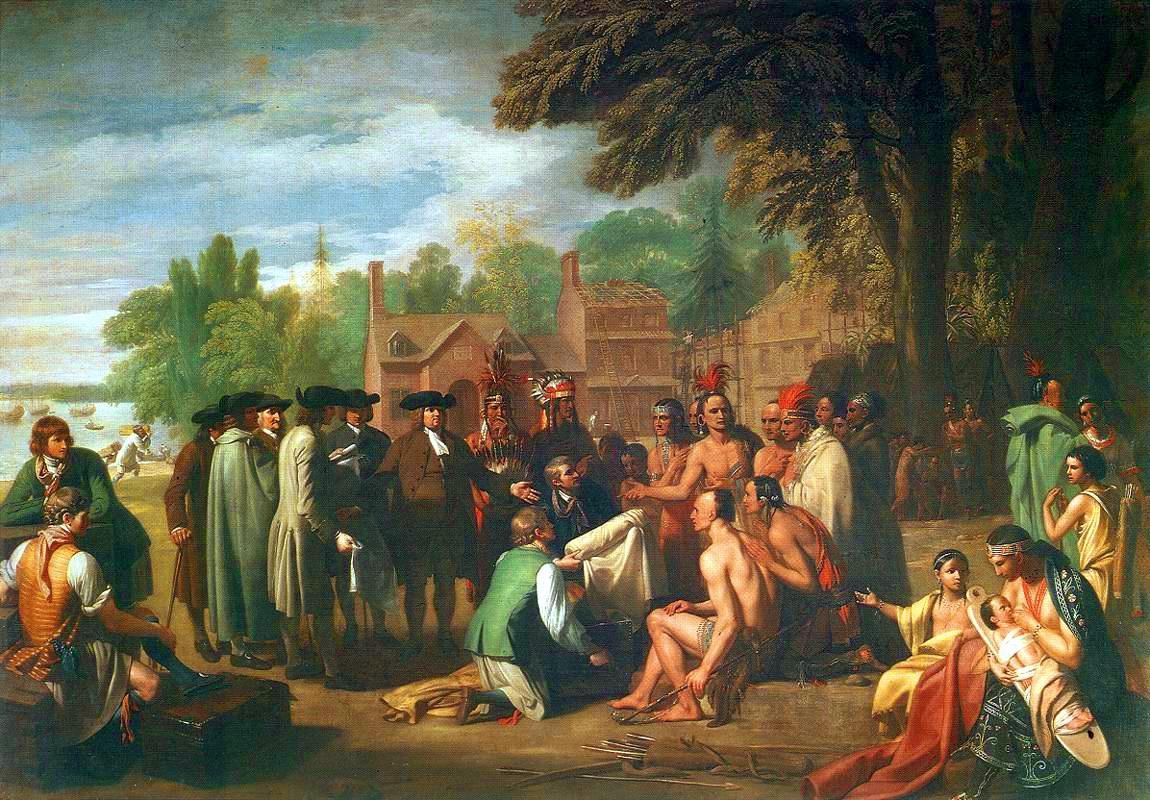
William Penn and Indians with treaty under a large elm in 1683, as shown in a painting by Benjamin West

- The Treaty Elm, Philadelphia, Pennsylvania. In what is now Penn Treaty Park, the founder of Pennsylvania, William Penn, is said to have entered into a treaty of peace in 1683 with the native Lenape Turtle Clan under a picturesque elm tree immortalized in a painting by Benjamin West. West made the tree, already a local landmark, famous by incorporating it into his painting after hearing legends (of unknown veracity) about the tree being the location of the treaty. No documentary evidence exists of any treaty Penn signed beneath a particular tree. On 6 March 1810 a great storm blew the tree down. Measurements taken at the time showed it to have a circumference of 24 feet (7.3 m), and its age was estimated to be 280 years. Wood from the tree was made into furniture, canes, walking sticks and various trinkets that Philadelphians kept as relics.

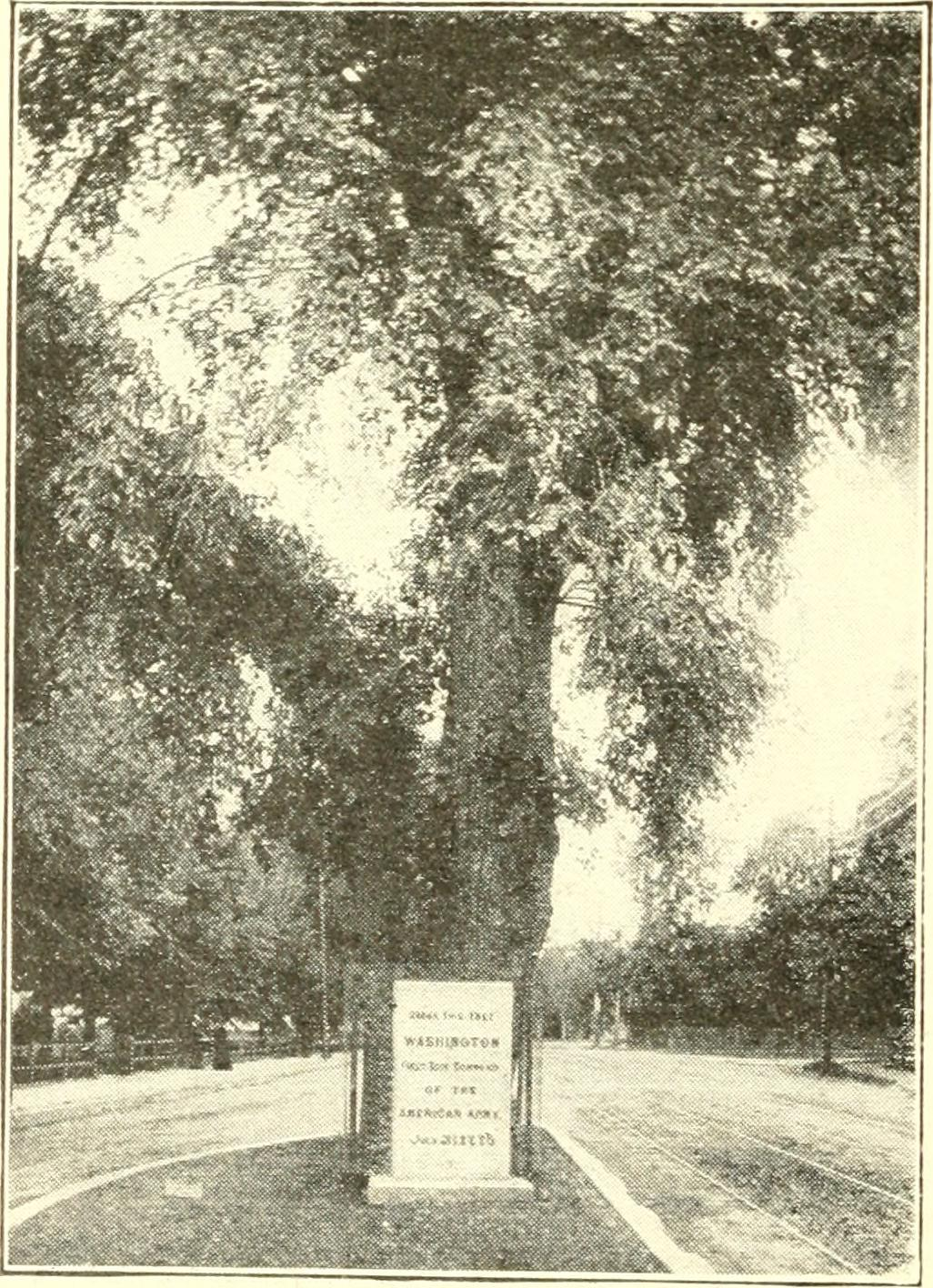
The Washington Elm, Cambridge, Massachusetts (c.1900)

- The Washington Elm, Cambridge, Massachusetts. George Washington is said to have taken command of the American Continental Army under the Washington Elm in Cambridge on 3 July 1775. The tree survived until the 1920s and "was thought to be a survivor of the primeval forest". In 1872, a large branch fell from it and was used to construct a pulpit for a nearby church. The tree, an American White Elm, became a celebrated attraction, with its own plaque, a fence constructed around it and a road moved in order to help preserve it. The tree was cut down (or fell – sources differ) in October 1920 after an expert determined it was dead. The city of Cambridge had plans for it to be "carefully cut up and a piece sent to each state of the country and to the District of Columbia and Alaska," according to The Harvard Crimson. As late as the early 1930s, garden shops advertised that they had cuttings of the tree for sale, although the accuracy of the claims has been doubted. A Harvard "professor of plant anatomy" examined the tree rings days after the tree was felled and pronounced it between 204 and 210 years old, making it at most 62 years old when Washington took command of the troops at Cambridge. The tree would have been a little more than 2 feet (0.61 m) in diameter (at 30 inches (760 mm) above ground) in 1773. In 1896, an alumnus of the University of Washington obtained a rooted cutting of the Cambridge tree and sent it to Professor Edmund Meany at the university. The cutting was planted, cuttings were then taken from it, including one planted on 18 February 1932, the 200th anniversary of the birth of George Washington, for whom Washington state is named. That tree remains on the campus of the Washington State Capitol. Just to the west of the tree is a small elm from a cutting made in 1979.

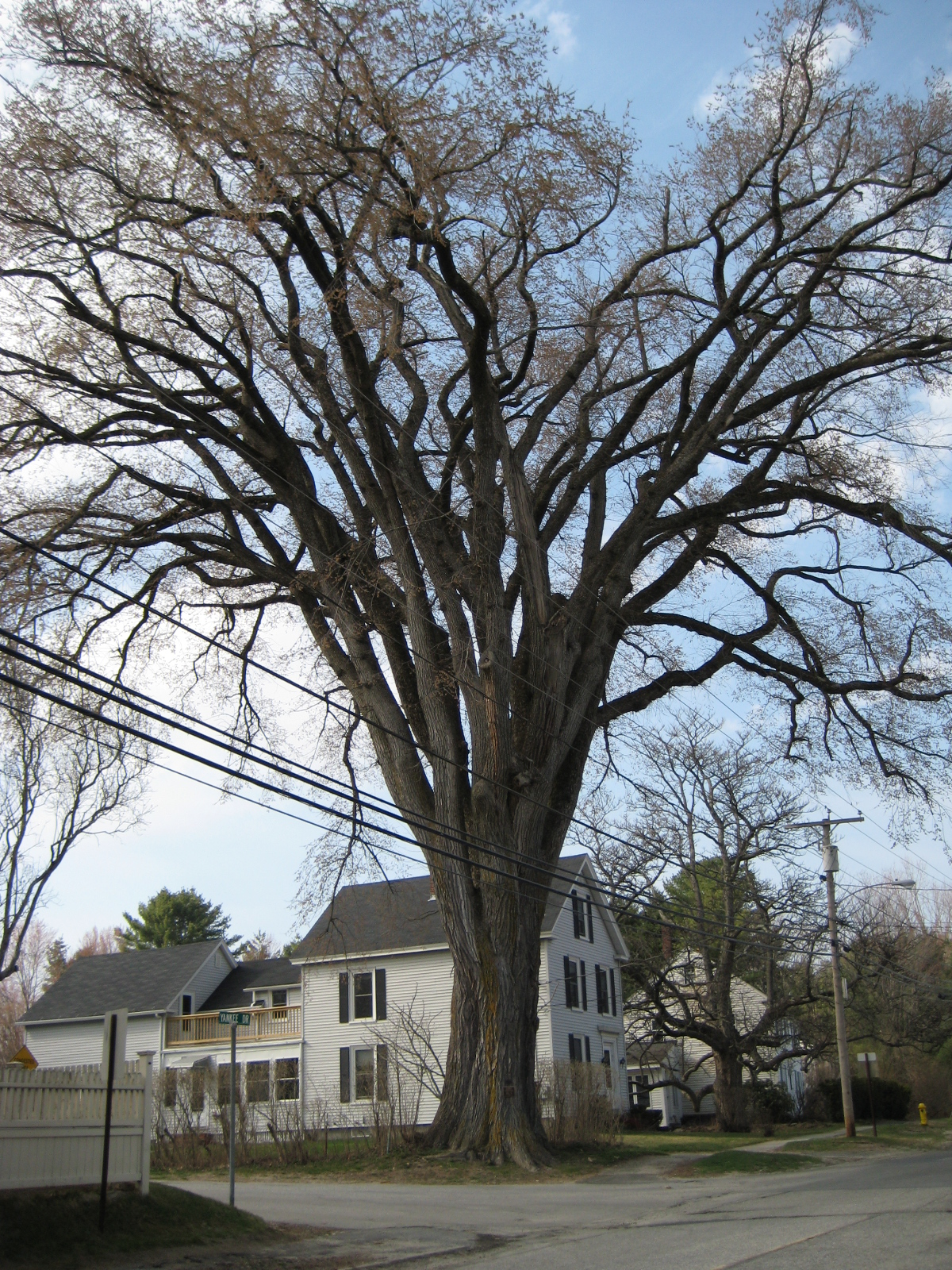
"Herbie", once New England's oldest and tallest elm, was cut in 2010 after a long battle with Dutch elm disease.

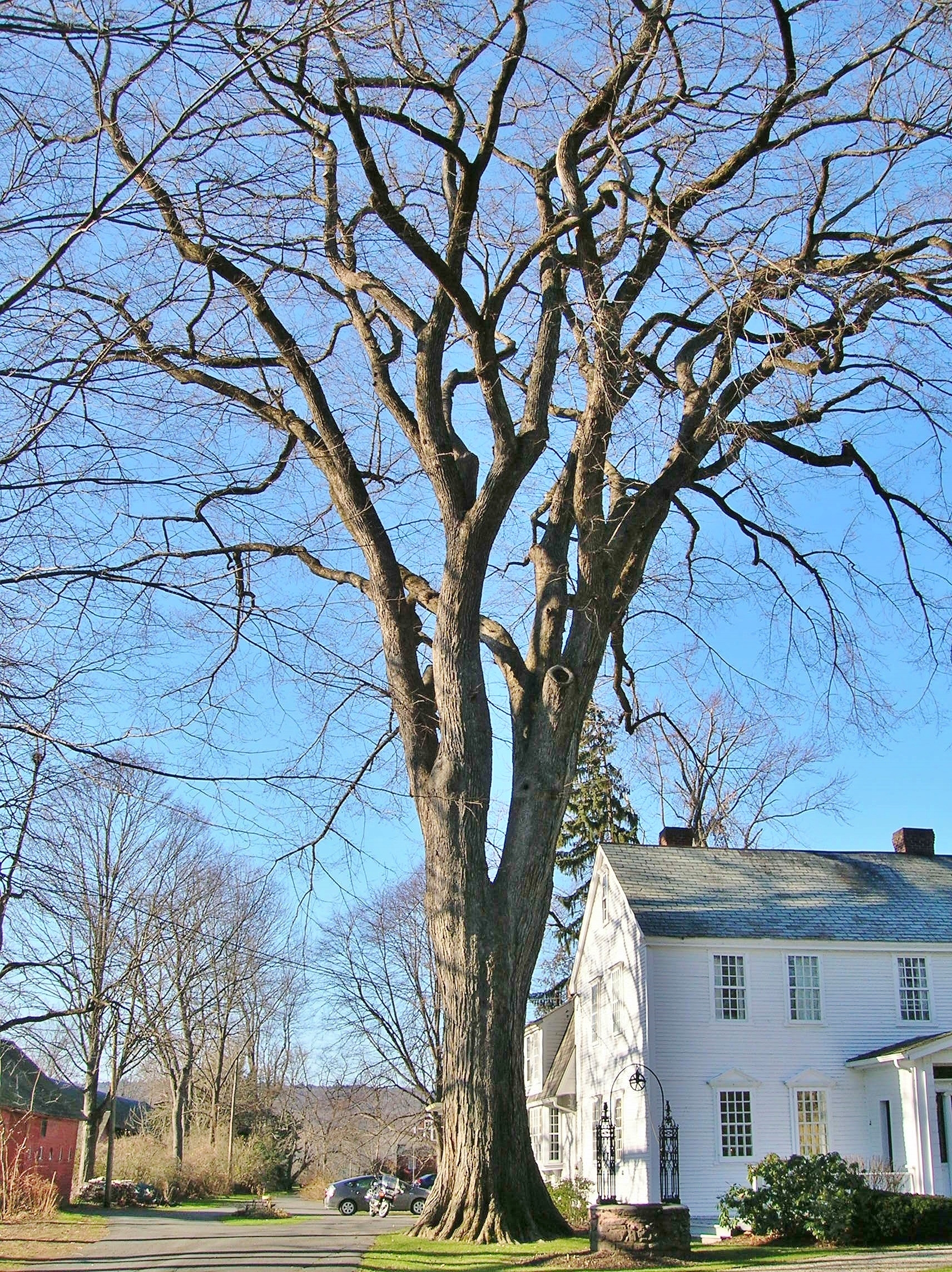
Former Massachusetts champion American elm in Old Deerfield, which was removed in 2017 due to Dutch elm disease. This photo is from December 2011, when the tree was still alive and apparently thriving.

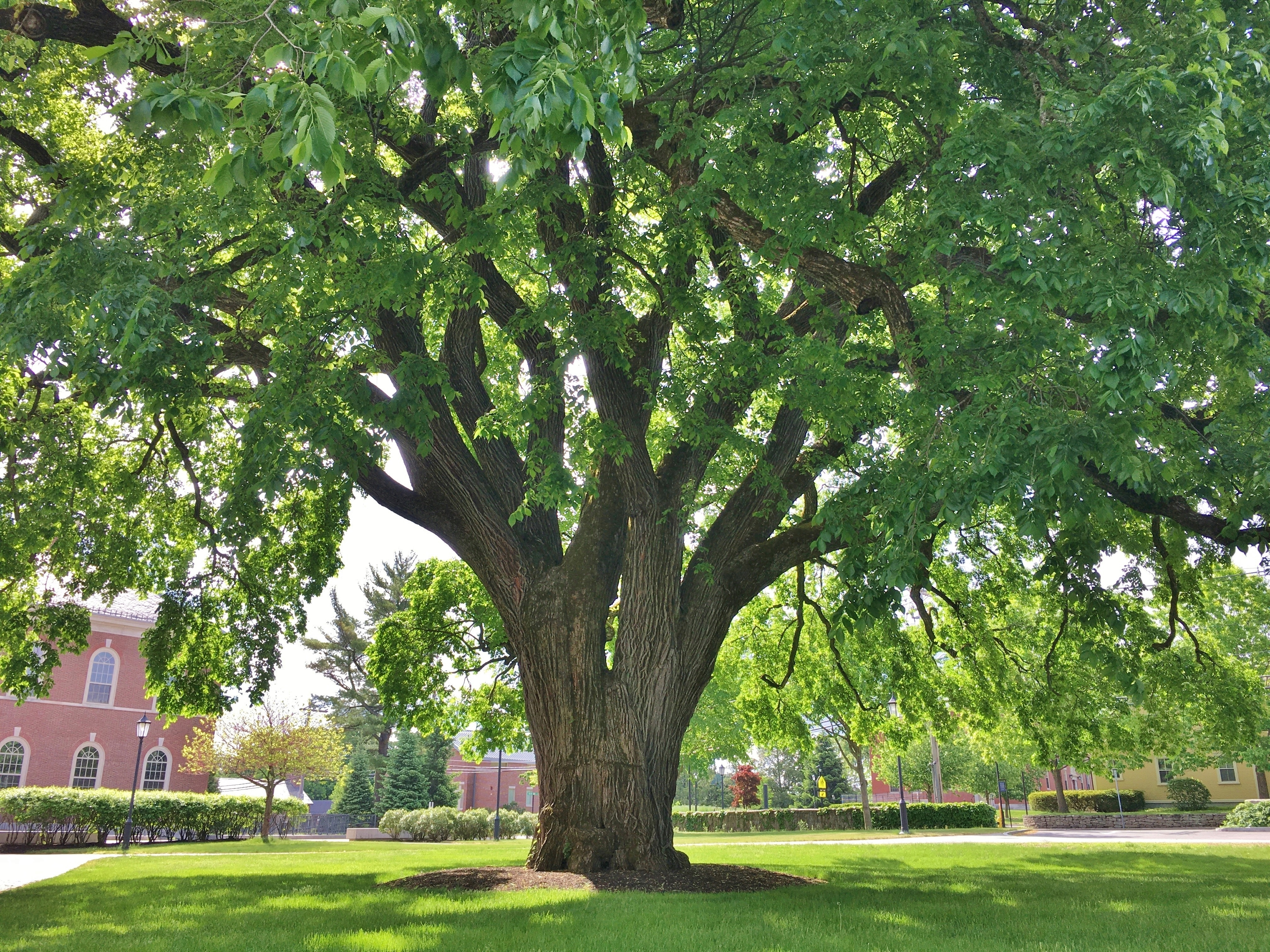
"Great Elm Tree" at Phillips Academy in Andover, Massachusetts (May 2020).

- "Herbie" in Yarmouth, Maine, stood by present-day East Main Street (Route 88) from 1793 to 2010. At 110 feet (34 m) in height, it was believed to be, between 1997 and the date of its felling, the oldest and tallest Ulmus americana in New England. The tree, which partially stood in the front yard of a private residence, had a 20-foot (6.1 m) circumference and (until mid-2008) a 93-foot (28 m) crown spread. As of 2003, only twenty of Yarmouth's original 739 elms had survived Dutch elm disease. In August 2009 it was revealed that, after battling fifteen bouts of Dutch elm disease, the tree had lost, and on 19 January 2010 it was cut down.
- The Liberty Tree, an elm on Boston Common in Boston, Massachusetts, was a rallying point for the growing resistance to the rule of England over the American colonies.
- The Great Elm on Boston Common, supposed to have been in existence before the settlement of Boston, at the time of its destruction by the storm of 15 February 1876 measured 22 ft (6.7 m) in circumference.
- George Washington's Elm, Washington, D.C. George Washington supposedly had a favorite spot under an elm tree near the United States Capitol Building from which he would watch construction of the building. The elm stood near the Senate wing of the Capitol building until 1948.
- The Logan Elm stood near Circleville, Ohio. The 65-foot-tall (20 m) tree had a trunk circumference of 24 feet (7.3 m) and a crown spread of 180 feet (55 m). Weakened by Dutch elm disease, the tree died in 1964 from storm damage. The Logan Elm State Memorial commemorates the site and preserves various associated markers and monuments. According to tradition, Chief Logan of the Mingo tribe delivered a passionate speech at a peace-treaty meeting under this elm in 1774, said to be the most famous speech ever given by a Native American.
- The Sauble Elm. With a girth of 24 feet 9 inches (7.54 m) and a height of over 130 feet (40 m), the Sauble Elm, a white elm (Ulmus americana) which once grew beside the banks of the Sauble River between the towns of Hepworth and Sauble Beach in the county of Bruce in the province of Ontario, was one of the largest "wild" elms in North America. The tree succumbed to Dutch elm disease and was felled in 1968. A ring count established that it had begun life in the year 1701.
- The "Great Elm Tree" at Phillips Academy in Andover, Massachusetts is believed to have been standing for at least 200 years. It is being well cared for and receives regular treatments for Dutch elm disease.

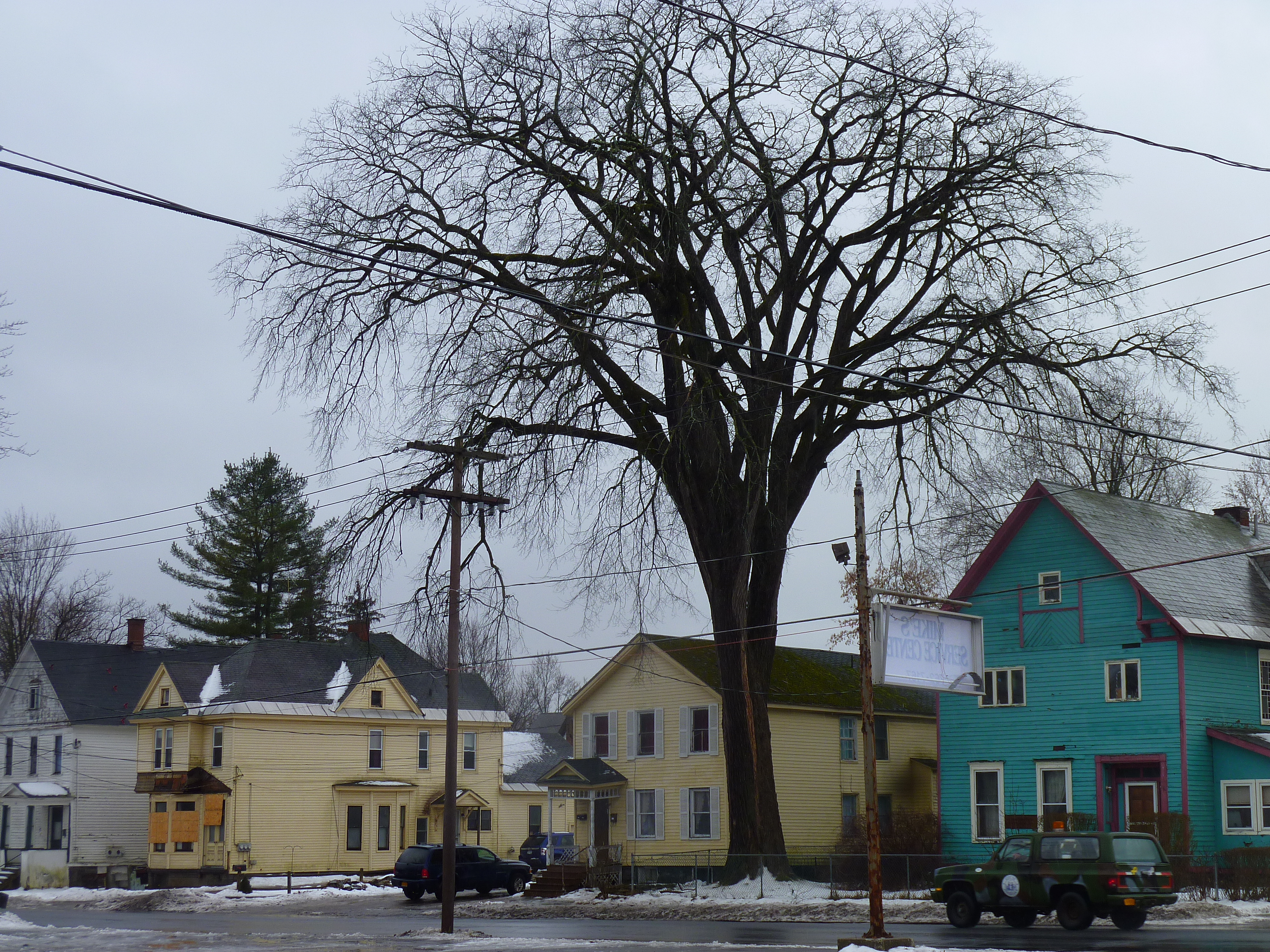
Johnstown Elm in Johnstown, NY. 196 inch circumference, 85 feet tall, disease free in September, 2013. Largest elm in New York state, photo January 2012. (No longer standing as of October 2018.)

- The Johnstown Elm, in Johnstown, New York, as of September 2013 did not show any signs of Dutch elm disease. In October 2018 all that remained was a weathered stump, cut perhaps two years earlier. It had a circumference of 196 inches (16.3 ft; 5.0 m), a height of 85 feet (26 m), and a crown of 88 feet (27 m). It grew in the front yard of a house in a small upstate city, and was probably over 200 years old. See photo at right.
- The Philipsburg Elm, Philipsburg, Quebec, was a 280-year-old 30-meter (98 ft) Ulmus americana, dubbed "the king of elms". It was cut down in March 2009 after death from Dutch elm disease.
- "Elmo", Brown University, Providence, Rhode Island, a large elm that "once defined the Thayer Street entrance to Brown's new Watson Institute for International and Public Affairs," contracted Dutch elm disease and was torn down in December 2003, according to a campus news release. The tree "was thought to have been between 80 and 100 years old. Wood from the tree, one of the largest on campus, was used in various student art projects."
- The Association Island Elm, New York state. The General Electric think tank organization, the Elfun Society, founded in 1928 at Association Island in the Thousand Islands area of northern New York state, is named after a famous elm tree on the 65-acre (260,000 m^{2}) isle. The tree died in the 1970s, but it survives in the elm tree logo still used by Elfun.

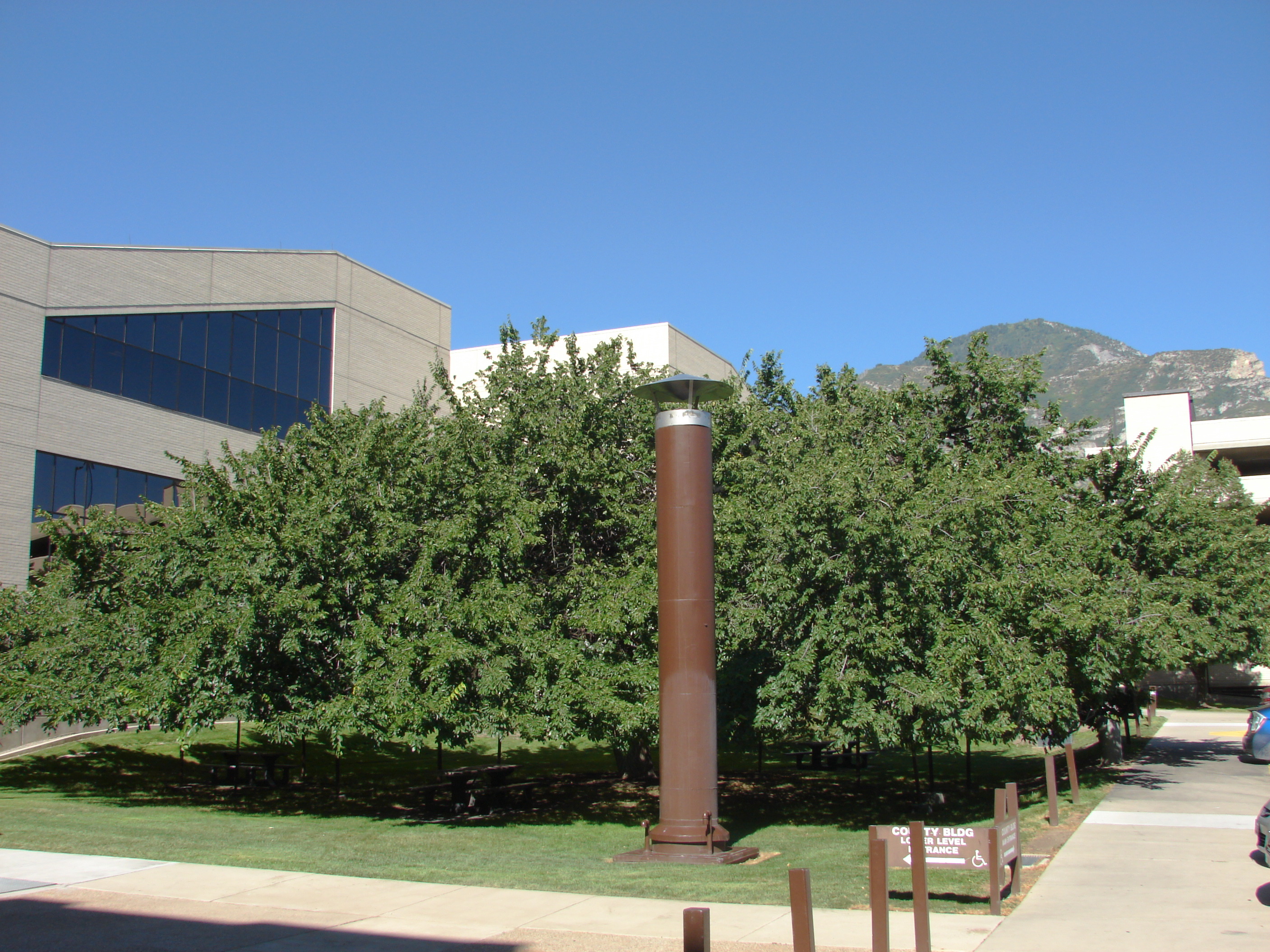
The Tabletop Elm (Ulmus americana) at the Utah County complex in Provo, Utah, July 2015.

- The Tabletop Elm in Provo, Utah. Immediately south of the Utah County Administration Building and just east of the Historic Utah County Courthouse in downtown Provo resides possibly a one-of-a-kind elm tree. Officially it is a specimen of Ulmus americana, but is unusual because it grows sideways, making it a "tabletop" elm tree. The tree was planted in 1927, and currently its several branches are supported by specialized braces to allow movement and growth. Every fall seven dump truck loads are required to remove all the leaves. Both reproduction and cloning efforts have been unsuccessful; the tree's seeds do not mature into the tabletop shape.
- New Haven, Connecticut, had the first public tree planting program in America, producing a canopy of mature trees (including some large elms) that gave New Haven the nickname "The Elm City". This later gave rise to the Yale song, Neath the Elms.
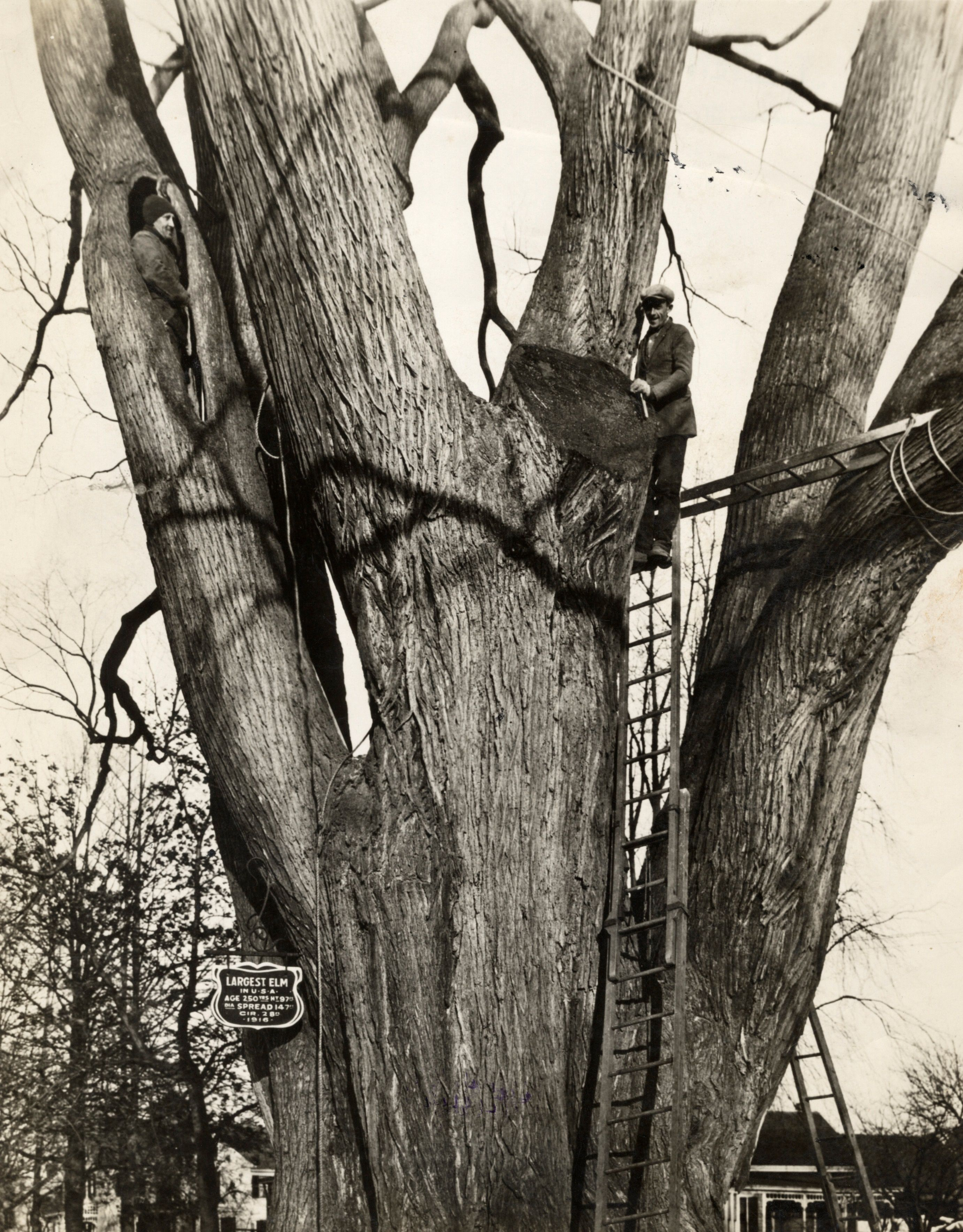
- Wetherfields elm treated with treesurgery in 1926
  The Wetherfield Elm was planted in 1758. It had at last a diameter of 14’6” and the circumference was 48 feet. The tree was 97 feet tall and had canopy of a 165-foot. It was also called the great elm. The tree died in 1950.
- The current Tree Register of the British Isles (T.R.O.B.I.) champion American elm tree lives in Avondale Forest near Rathdrum, County Wicklow, Ireland. The tree had a height of 22.5 metres (74 ft) and a diameter at breast height of 98 centimetres (39 in) (circumference of 308 centimetres (121 in)) when measured in 2000. The tree replaced on the Register a larger champion located in Woodvale Cemetery in Sussex, England, which in 1988 had a height of 27 metres (89 ft) and a diameter of 115 centimetres (45 in) (circumference of 361 centimetres (142 in)).

== Wych Elm Ulmus glabra ==
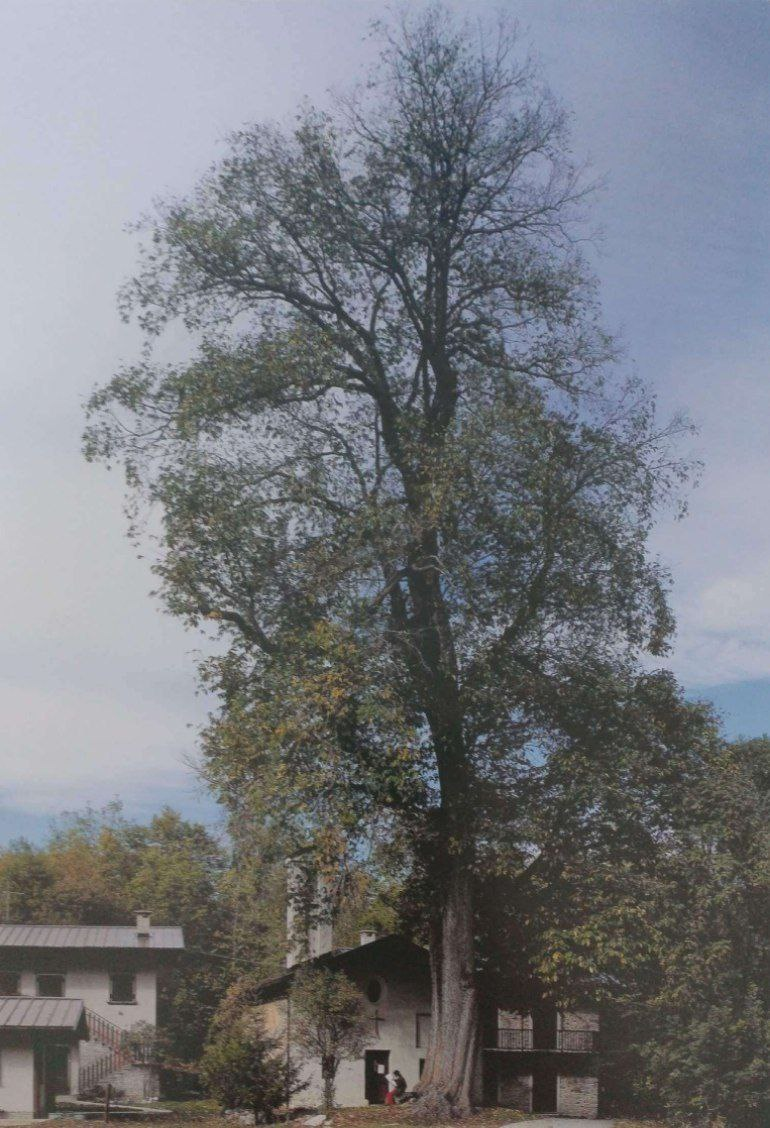
"L'Olmo montano di Bergemolo", a wych elm planted in 1620, Bergemolo, Piedmont, Italy (2004)

- "Joe Pullen's Tree", a wych elm (Ulmus glabra) in Oxford, was planted in about 1700 by the Rev. Josiah Pullen, vice president of Magdalen Hall. Josiah Pullen "used to Walk to that place every day, sometimes twice a day", according to diarist Thomas Hearne. The famous essayist Richard Steele (1672–1729) said his regular walks as an undergraduate to the elm with Pullen helped him to reach a "florid old age". The elm became famous at Oxford and its fame grew with its age. In November 1795, Gentleman's Magazine reported that "Joe Pullen, the famous elm, upon Headington hills, had one of its large branches torn off and carried to a great distance." When new parliamentary district boundaries were drawn after the Reform Act 1832, the tree was named as a landmark helping to mark the boundary of the Parliamentary Borough of Oxford. In early 1847, the owner of the property arranged to have the tree torn down, and work started on it before protests put an end to the plan. By 1892, however, rot had set in, and the tree was torn down to its (large and tall) "stump". Early in the morning of 13 October 1909, vandals set fire to the stump. A plaque was soon after installed on the side wall of Davenport House in Cuckoo Lane, marking the spot. It reads: Near this spot stood the famous elm planted by the Rev. Josiah Pullen about 1680 and known as Jo Pullen's Tree. Destroyed by fire on 13 October 1909.
- "L'Olmo montano di Bergemolo", a wych elm in Bergemolo, 5 km south of Demonte in Piedmont, Italy, was planted in 1620 and had a bole-girth 6.2 m (at 2.0 m DBH) and a height of 26 m. in 2008. It was still present in 2025.

== Dutch elm Ulmus × hollandica ==
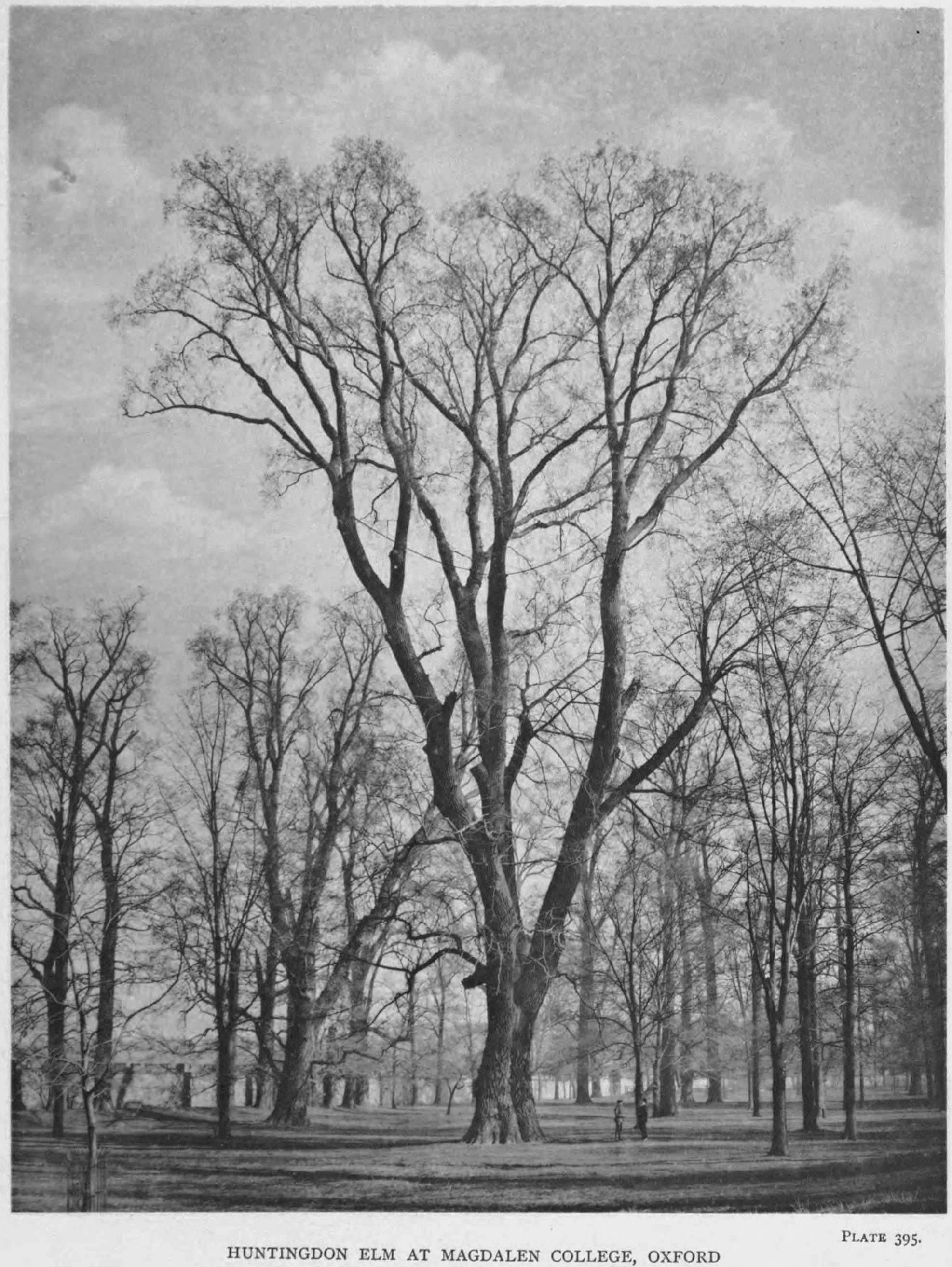
The great hybrid elm in The Grove, Magdalen College, Oxford (1906)

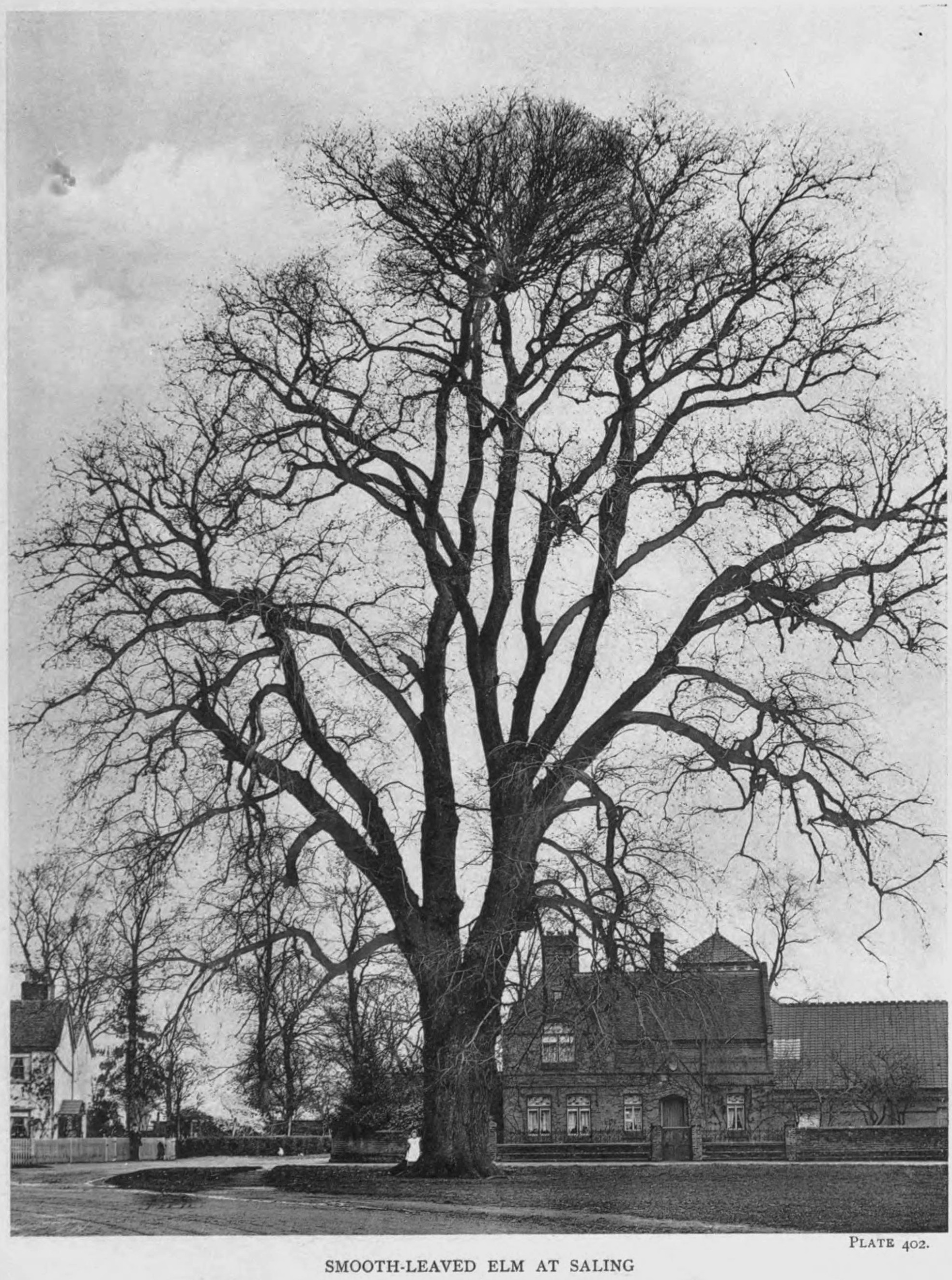
The Great Saling elm (1906), identified by R. H. Richens as U. × hollandica

- The Magdalen Elm, a great elm in the Grove of Magdalen College, Oxford, photographed by Henry Taunt in 1900 and said by Elwes to be the largest elm in Great Britain, was long believed to be wych but was found on examination by Elwes and Henry to be a Huntingdon-type hybrid that at c.300 years old pre-dated the cultivation of Huntingdon Elm. When it blew down in 1911, by Elwes' measurements it had been 142 feet high and 27 feet in girth at five feet, and contained 2787 cubic feet of timber.
- The Great Saling Elm. With a girth of 6.86 m and a height of 40 m, the elm on Great Saling Green, Great Saling, near Braintree, Essex, identified by R. H. Richens (1983) as an Ulmus × hollandica hybrid, was reputed to be the largest elm in England, before succumbing to Dutch elm disease in the 1980s. A photograph of the tree can be found (plate 402) in Elwes & Henry's Trees of Great Britain & Ireland, published in 1913, wherein it is identified as U. nitens (U. minor subsp. minor).
- The Oudemanhuispoort Elm. 34.6 m tall and 4.4 m in girth, this Ulmus × hollandica 'Belgica' in Oudemanhuispoort, Amsterdam, planted in 1895, is the largest elm in the Netherlands.
- "The MooCoo Tree", in Athens, Georgia, stands in front of Theta Chi fraternity at the University of Georgia; it is one of the few Dutch elm (Ulmus × hollandica) trees in North America east of the Mississippi. Students are known to engage in the "MooCoo Challenge," which consists climbing into the Elm and consuming twelve beers in less than 2 hours before coming down.

== Field elm Ulmus minor ==
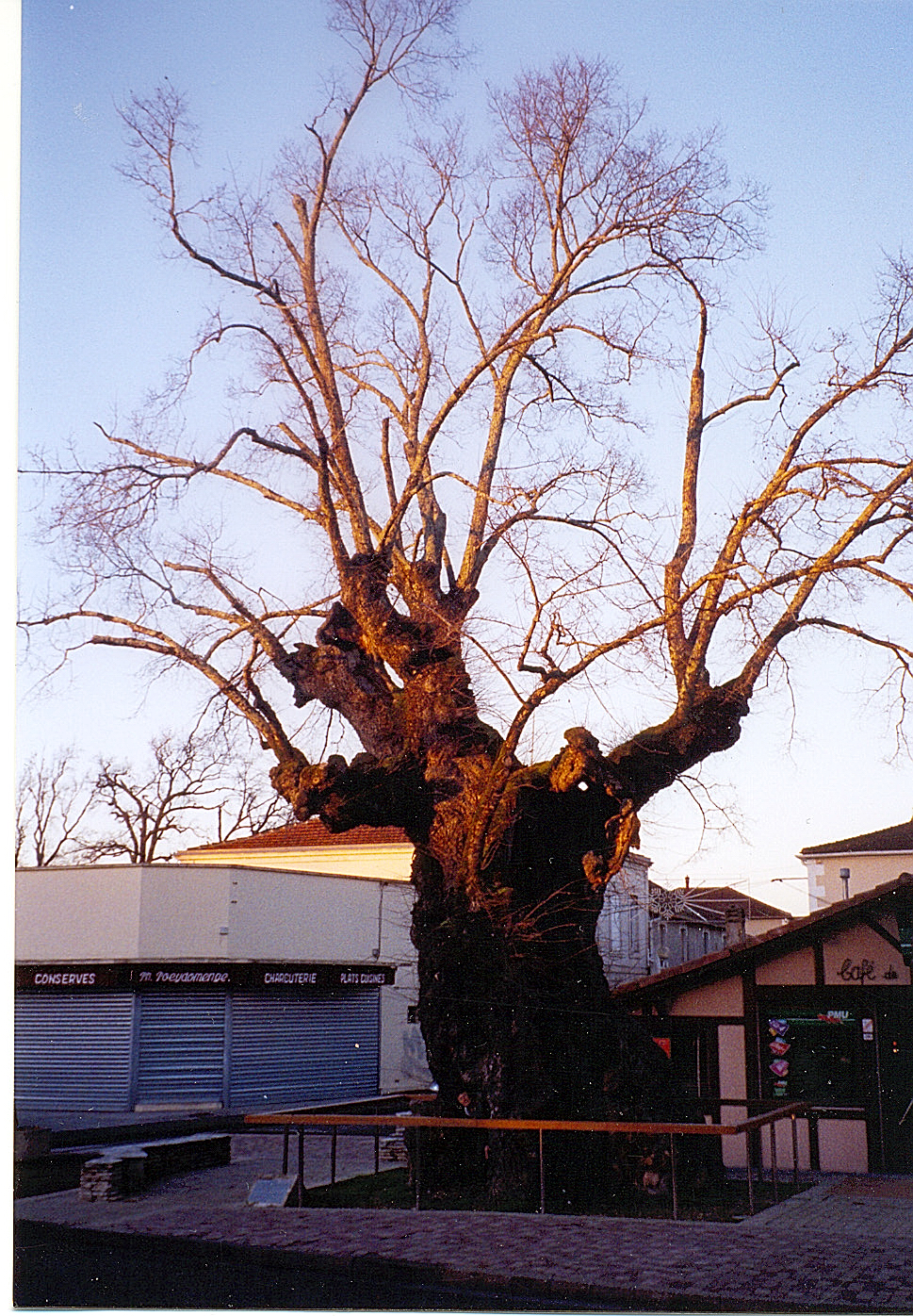
The Biscarrosse Elm, France, field elm (Ulmus minor) planted 1350, died 2010.

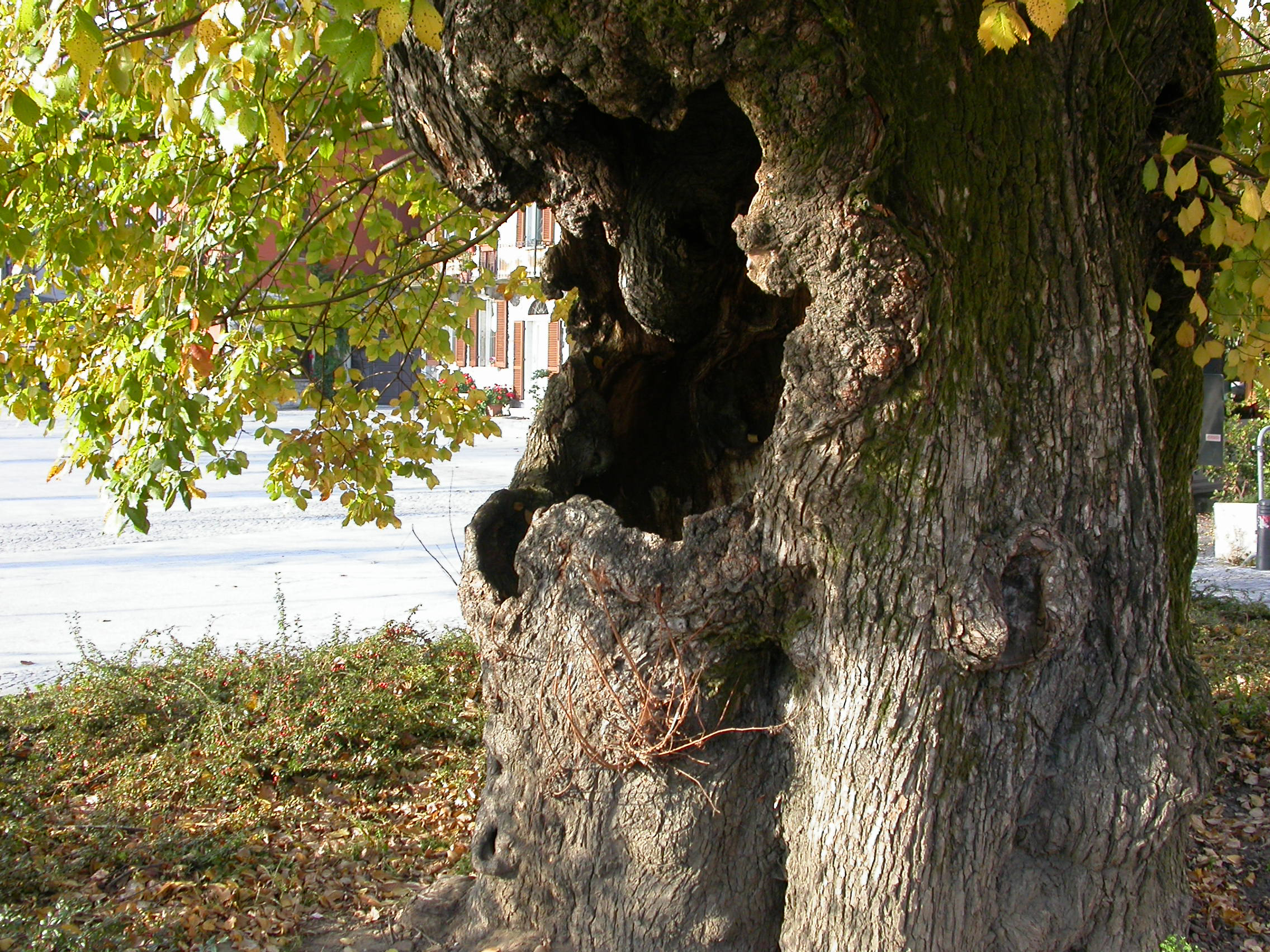
L'Olmo di Mergozzo, Piedmont (Ulmus minor), present in 1600 and still standing today

- The Metaxades Elm. An ancient field elm (Ulmus minor) stood until recently in the village square of Metaxades, Thrace, Greece. Having abandoned their original village in 1286 after cholera outbreaks, the villagers re-founded it in the hills where a young elm grew beside a spring. The elm (reputedly the original) and fountain were until recently the focal-point of the village.
- The Biscarrosse Elm. Reputedly planted in 1350, this field elm (Ulmus minor) survived in the centre of Biscarrosse in the Landes region of south-west France until 2010, when it finally succumbed to Dutch elm disease. Its habit of producing a circle of white epicormic leaves on the bole every spring gave rise to a local legend. The 'white wreath' was said to be related to the public humiliation in 1450 and death beneath the tree of a local girl wrongly accused of adultery.
- The Elm of Bettange. Reputedly planted in 1593, this field elm (Ulmus minor) in the village of Bettange in the Moselle region of France is now a wreck In so far as measurements can be taken of its ruined bole, its girth has been estimated at over 6 m.
- "L’Olmo di Lando", known in Italy as "L’Olmo Bello" (:The Beautiful Elm). This shapely, open-grown field elm (Ulmus minor) stood at Ostra near Senigallia in the Italian Marches, where its "montagna di verde" (:mountain of greenery) attracted many admirers, who bought its portrait in postcards. It had a 110 m crown-circumference, a 35 m crown-diameter, and a 6,30 m bole-girth at ground level. It was felled in 1935 when it lost its looks and threatened to damage those of the people standing beneath it. A ring-count established that it was over 400 years old.
- The Mergozzo Elm. A four-hundred-year-old Ulmus minor, 5.55 metres in girth, survives in the town of Mergozzo in Piedmont. 'L'olmo di Mergozzo', like its French counterparts 'l'orme de Biscarosse' and 'l’orme de Bettange', is hollowed out by age, its life prolonged by pollarding.
- The Old Elm. About 1100 years, is a centuries-old tree of the species field elm that grows in the center of Sliven, Bulgaria, and is one of the symbols of the city. In 2014, The Old Elm won the "European Tree of the Year" by 77,523 votes.
- The "bleeding" elms of Saint Nicholas the Martyr, Thessaly. In the grounds of the Greek Orthodox monastery of Saint Nicholas near Vounaina (Βούναινα), Thessaly, built on the site of the slaughter, c. 720, by marauding Avars, of the Byzantine ascetic St Nicholas the Martyr (Άγιος Νικόλαος ο εν Βουνένοις) and his followers, stands a group of revered elms that in May on the anniversary of the martyrdom "bleed" a purplish fluid, believed by many of the Orthodox faith to have miraculous healing properties. The phenomenon, possibly related to wetwood, attracts large crowds to the monastery every year.

== English elm Ulmus procera ==
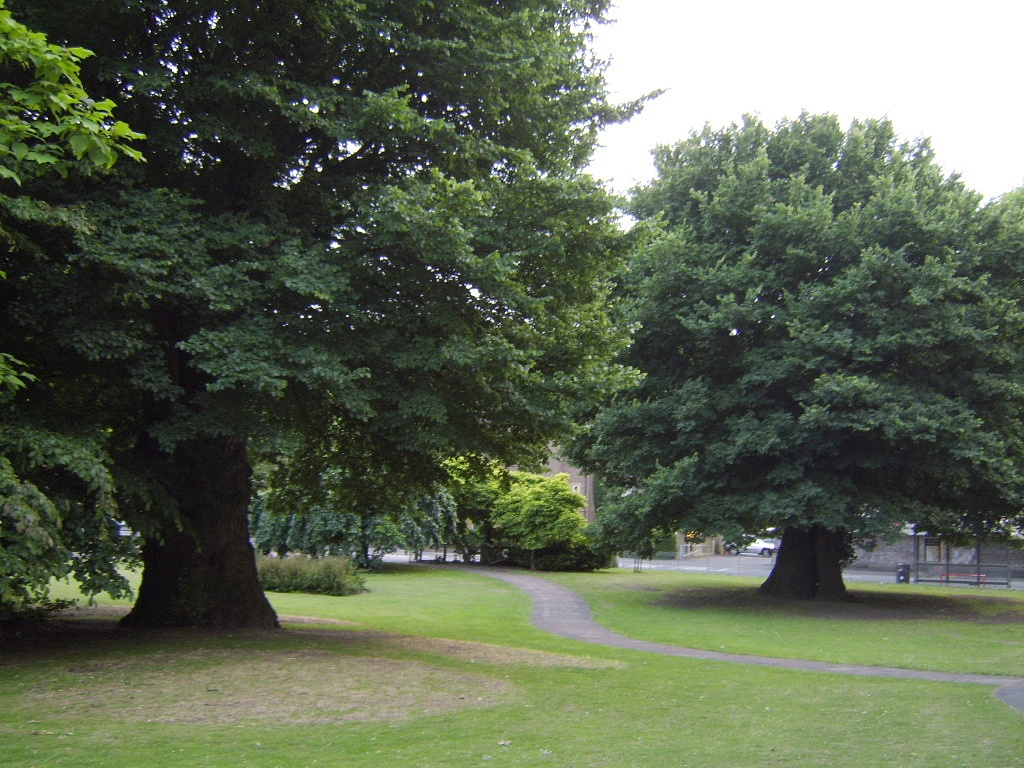
The Preston Twins, English elms in Brighton, England

- The Preston Twins in Preston Park, Brighton, England, are the two oldest English elms in the world. Both trees are aged over 400 years and exceed 20 feet (6.1 m) in girth. They have been regularly pollarded for many years and both trunks are hollow. In 2019, Brighton and Hove City Council announced that one of the trees was to be felled due to an infestation of Dutch elm disease.

== Other, unidentified elms ==
- The Langton Elm in Sherwood Forest, Nottinghamshire, was a large elm tree that "was for a long time so remarkable as to have a special keeper", according to a book published in 1881.

== See also ==
- List of individual trees
