= William Edmund Davies =

British bookmaker

- Born: 1819; London, England
- Died: 4 October 1879 (aged 61); Brighton, Sussex, England
- Occupation: Bookmaker
- Years active: c. 1840s–1857

William Edmund Davies (1819–1879) was a bookmaker, who left a sum of money that enabled Brighton Corporation to purchase Preston Park for the public.

== Early years ==
Davies, known as "the Leviathan", the son of a carpenter, was born in London in 1819, near the site of the Great Northern Hotel, and his earlier years were spent in the service of Cubitt & Co., contractors and builders, Gray's Inn Road, London.

== Entry into bookmaking ==
Having been sent with some other workmen to repair the inside of the subscription-rooms at Newmarket, Suffolk, he overheard a conversation about some approaching races, and perceiving that money could be made by one who was quick at figures he immediately commenced business with his fellow workmen. His success as a petty bookmaker, who laid the odds in half crowns, was so great that he gave up carpenter's work and became an open-air betting-man in Long Acre, London, and the adjoining streets.

== Bookmaking operations and success ==
He frequented racecourses, where he joined the throng of ready-money bookmakers outside the ring, generally laying a point or two above the odds obtainable inside. Great advantage being taken of the more liberal odds that he laid, he went within the public betting rooms.

His customers in London were very numerous, and he originated in 1846 the betting-list system, which was continued until 20 August 1853, when such lists were declared illegal by a special act of parliament. The first of his lists he hung up at the Salisbury Arms in Durham Street, Strand; at a house known as Barr's Windsor Castle, 27 Long Acre, a second list was posted, and at these places he and his clerks stood at huge bankers' ledgers and entered the bets. The certainty that claims on him would be paid on demand made his winning tickets as negotiable among his customers as bank-notes. Davies established himself at the head of the profession by betting with the Earl of Strafford £12,000 to £1,000 on The Cur for the Cesarewitch in 1848; he paid the money on the day after the race.

From that moment he enjoyed the chief patronage of all heavy backers of horses, and his lists ruled the market. In 1850, when Lord Zetland's Voltigeur was the favourite, Davies had to pay out nearly £40,000 over his list counter to his humbler clients, who had put their sovereigns on the race. In the previous year, on the defeat of Hotspur by the Flying Dutchman, he had lost a similar sum. He also lost heavily over Teddington at Epsom in 1851, and on the morning after the race sent Mr. C. C. F. Greville a cheque for £15,000. In the autumn of that year, however, Mrs. Taft and Truth in the Cesarewitch and the Cambridgeshire brought him in more than £50,000; but in 1852 the somewhat unlooked-for victory of Daniel O'Rourke in the Derby resulted in his having to pay upwards of £100,000 Despite his losses he opened the season of 1853 with £130,000 to his credit at the London and Westminster Bank; but £48,000 of this money he lost in that year, when West Australian won the Derby, and £30,000 of it went in one cheque to Mr. John Bowes. He became known as Davies the Leviathan, or more commonly as the Leviathan. His constant habit was to go to Tattersall's after the Derby, however great his losses, and pay on the Monday instead of waiting until the conventional settling Tuesday; and while his lists were in force he returned every night from Newmarket to attend to them, and provide the money for paying next day. Daily travelling and the excitement of daily betting thousands told on the constitution even of the Leviathan, and finding himself no longer equal to the struggle in which he was engaged, he wound up his business on the Friday in the Houghton meeting in 1857, and took his final leave of Newmarket.

== Retirement ==
On his retirement he first lived at the King and Queen Hotel, Brighton, but soon moved to 18 Gloucester Place, Brighton, where he died, from paralysis and phthisis, on 4 October 1879, aged 61. By his will he left property in railway shares valued at £60,000 to the Brighton corporation, subject to the payment of certain annuities. Mrs. Davies gave notice to dispute the will, but on 21 January 1880 an arrangement was made by which the greater part of the property came to the corporation on the death of the widow. Preston Park, Brighton, which cost £50,000, and was opened 8 November 1884, was purchased with this money.

== See also ==
- History of gambling in the United Kingdom
- Gambling in the United Kingdom
- Horse racing in Great Britain
