= Great Elm (Boston) =

Historical elm tree

Coordinates: 42.355511°N 71.064900°W

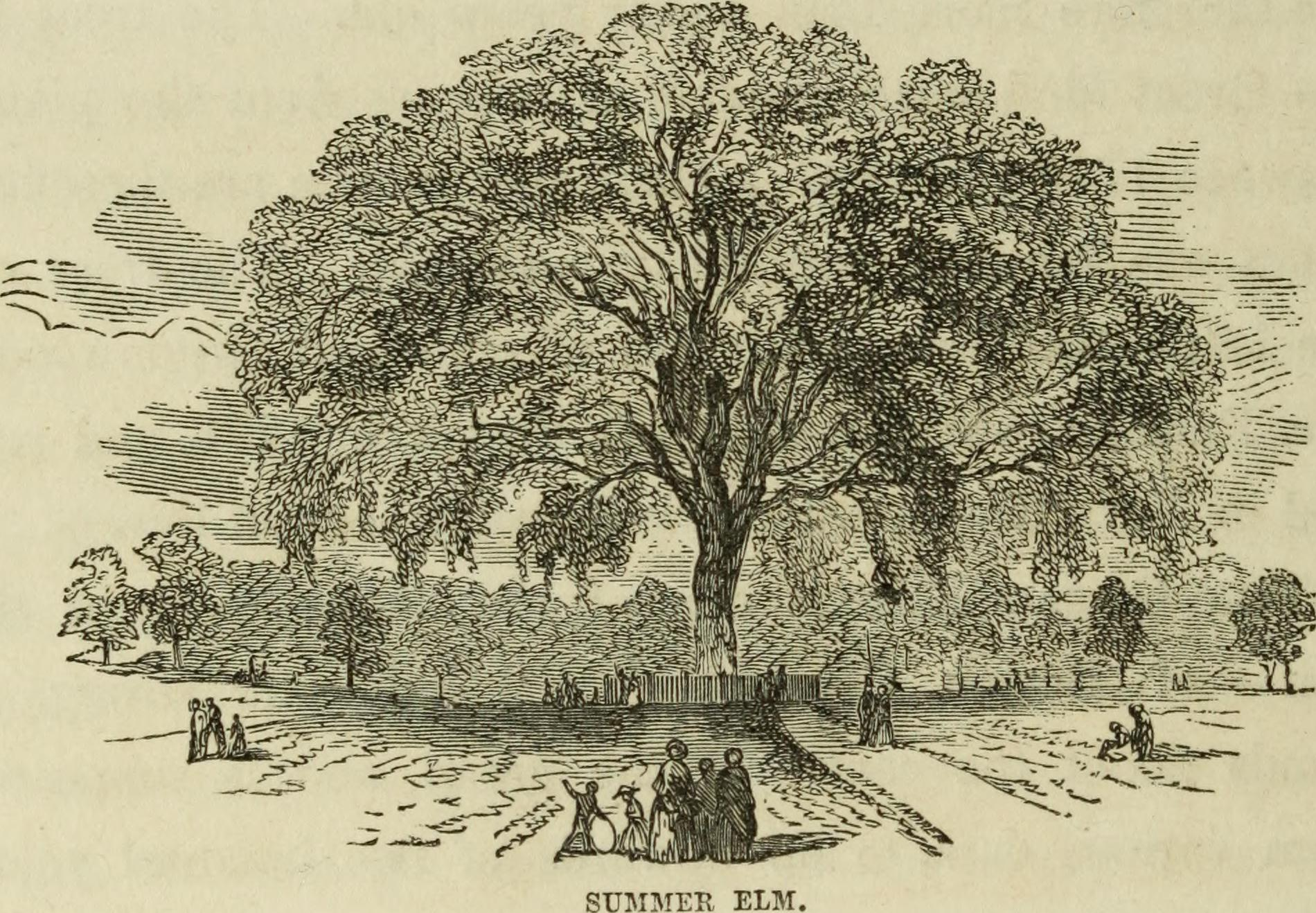
The Great Elm, from a mid-nineteenth century print

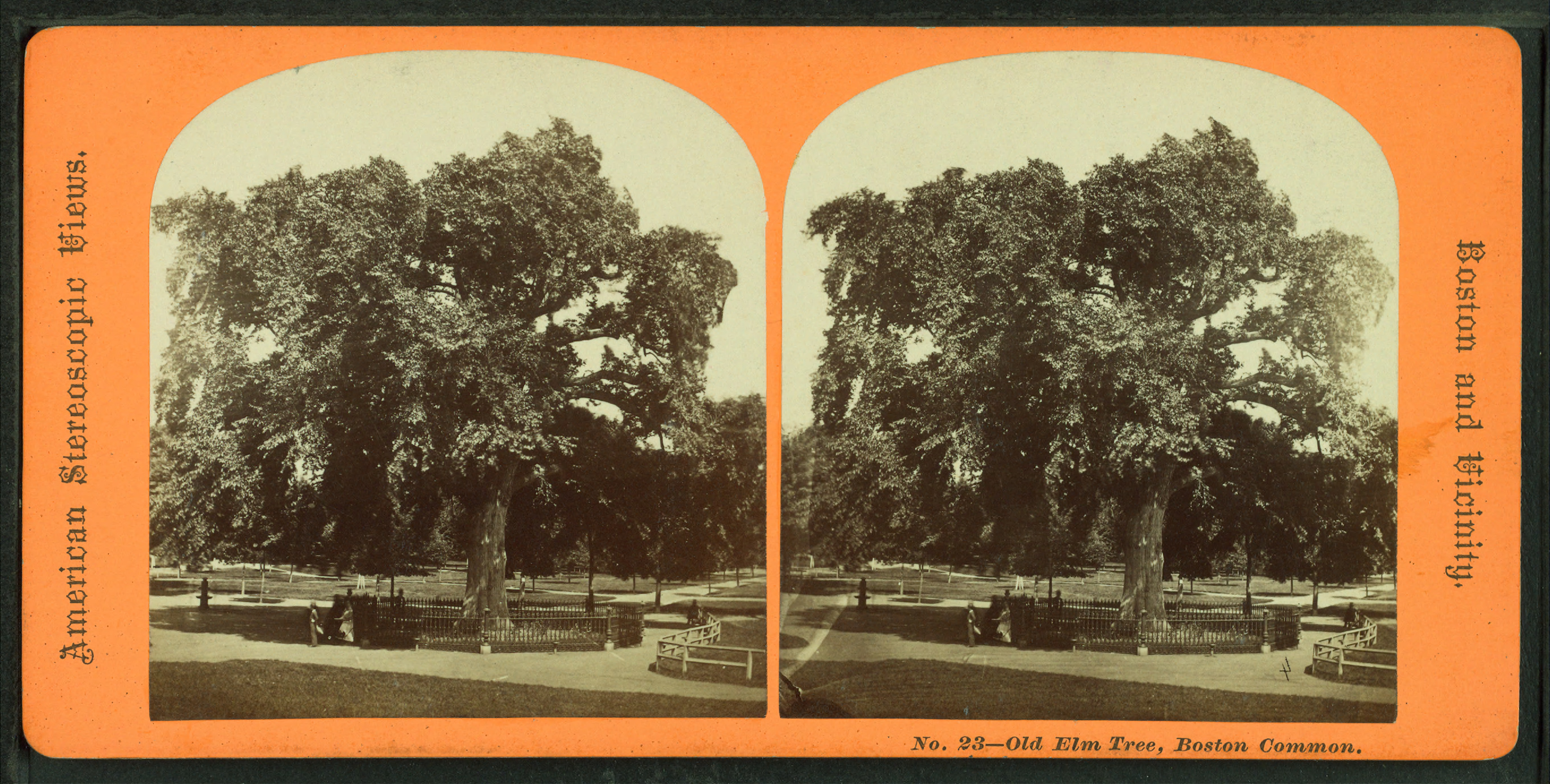
Stereoscopic view of Great Elm, 19th century

The Great Elm stood at the center of the Boston Common until February 15, 1876. The earliest maps of the area only showed three trees, one of which was the Great Elm. The other two trees, one of which was most likely the famed Liberty Tree, had been lost long before the Great Elm finally fell in the nineteenth century. Up to that point, the elm symbolized the Boston Common's landscape since—an early advocate for urban improvement asserted—the figure represented the finest example of "the favorite ornamental tree among us." The Great Elm's popularity inspired broader environmental efforts within the region. Consequently, planters believed that they "must plant [elms and oaks] for posterity," implicitly hoping that their efforts would result in a similar majestic outcome. These ancillary planting efforts elevated the popularity of the largest tree in the area, the Great Elm.

== Age and history ==
The tree has garnered the attention of Boston citizens throughout time. Nineteenth century boosters like Nehemiah Adams promoted the tree as the central actor of "the history of Boston and of our revolution." It was "often referred to as Boston's Oldest Inhabitant". Regular measurements highlight the impressiveness of the Great Elm's presence. According to Celebrate Boston, "in 1825 it was sixty-five feet high, the circumference at thirty inches from the ground being twenty-one feet eight inches, and the spread of the branches eighty-six feet." Over time, the tree continued to grow. By 1855, it stood "seventy-two feet and a half feet high; height of the first branch to the ground, twenty-two and a half foot; girth four feet from the ground, seventeen feet; average diameter of the greatest span of branches, one hundred and one feet." While the tremendous size of the tree attracted visitors, the weight and attention also placed enormous stress on the elderly tree that eventually contributed to its downfall.

The Boston Society of Natural History funded a scientific and historical study of the tree to determine its age and importance to the city, region, and nation. They noted that "the tree is an American Elm, belonging to a species admired and cultivated abroad for its gracefully pendant branches." Based on their research, they concluded that by 1722 the tree was already over one hundred years old, because of textual descriptions regarding its size. As such, in 1855 they concluded that "there is nothing improbable in the belief that the Elm on Boston Common is more than two hundred years old."

While some groups sought to scientifically determine the age of The Great Elm, apocryphal tales also attempted to highlight the history of the famous tree. Samuel Barber showed that, by 1670, a tradition emerged that "Hezekiah Henchman, or his father Daniel" planted the tree. Some have attempted to connect this to the Hancock family since a Henchman descendant, Lydia, married Thomas Hancock. Thomas and Lydia adopted his nephew, John Hancock, who later became the President of the Second Continental Congress and Governor of Massachusetts. In so doing, folklorists sought to connect The Great Elm with an iconic figure of the Revolutionary War era.

== Usage and transitions ==
The Great Elm sat at the center of the Boston Common, which city leaders purchased in 1634 for £30. Initially, the open area served the city as a cow pasture. As a result, very few individuals directly interacted with the Great Elm until the city transformed the designated section into a recreational center.

The Great Elm did not immediately become a locus of recreation. Rather, early in the city's history, the Great Elm helped fulfill civic corporal punishment needs. Native Americans, including the medicine man, Tantamous, were executed there during King Philip's War. According to Mary Farwell Ayer, "tradition asserts that many of the early executions in Boston took place on a limb of this tree. Many persons were tried and condemned to death during the seventeenth century." This reflected a broader implementation of the death penalty in Boston, which also included temporary gallows on the Common as well as firing squads. The Common, which at the time was often neglected due to its rural setting, began to transform once houses were built along its perimeter. Some of the most elite Bostonians, like John Hancock's uncle Thomas, desired to be near the Great Elm in the Boston Common, and built their large residences as close as possible.

This had a very positive impact on both the Boston Common and the prestige of the Great Elm. Even though the grounds were still used for military training, the Great Elm was no longer used for public executions. According to Ayer, as the number of people living nearby increased, the city began to improve the Common's condition and it consequently became an even more "popular recreation ground of the townspeople." During all of these transitions, the Great Elm stood as a silent witness to the city's progress.

Some of the elm's wood was used and preserved in books considered "rare" today. Its wood appears on the back cover of "Stark's Antique Views of Ye Towne of Boston" from 1882, for instance. Along with it is a message from the mayor of the time. A chair crafted from its wood sits in the rare book room of the Boston Public Library for all to admire the tree's importance in Boston history.

== Destruction and social significance ==
The age and overuse of the Great Elm gradually weakened its structural integrity. Over time, the amount of attention that it received led to its inevitable demise. In the mid-nineteenth century, the city placed a fence around the tree to prevent individuals from climbing on its weakened branches. In June 1860, a major storm severely damaged and scarred the tree. Finally, on February 15, 1876, another major storm that included heavy winds toppled the Great Elm.

Mark Antony Dewolfe Howe argued that the loss of this natural treasure "may have served a good purpose in making the community more tenacious of all its other possessions in the Common." As such, the social significance of this natural wonder inspired efforts to further preserve the Boston Common as a natural refuge alongside urban development. Prior to its destruction, the Great Elm represented a central location for visitors to meet. Even when the city took precautionary measures to protect the iconic centerpiece after a devastating storm in 1860, the tree still served as an inspirational symbol of Boston's past and present communities. Fortunately, photography emerged in time for images of the majestic Great Elm to be taken before it ultimately perished, and a number of groups had the opportunity to pose in front of the venerable icon.

== Legacy ==
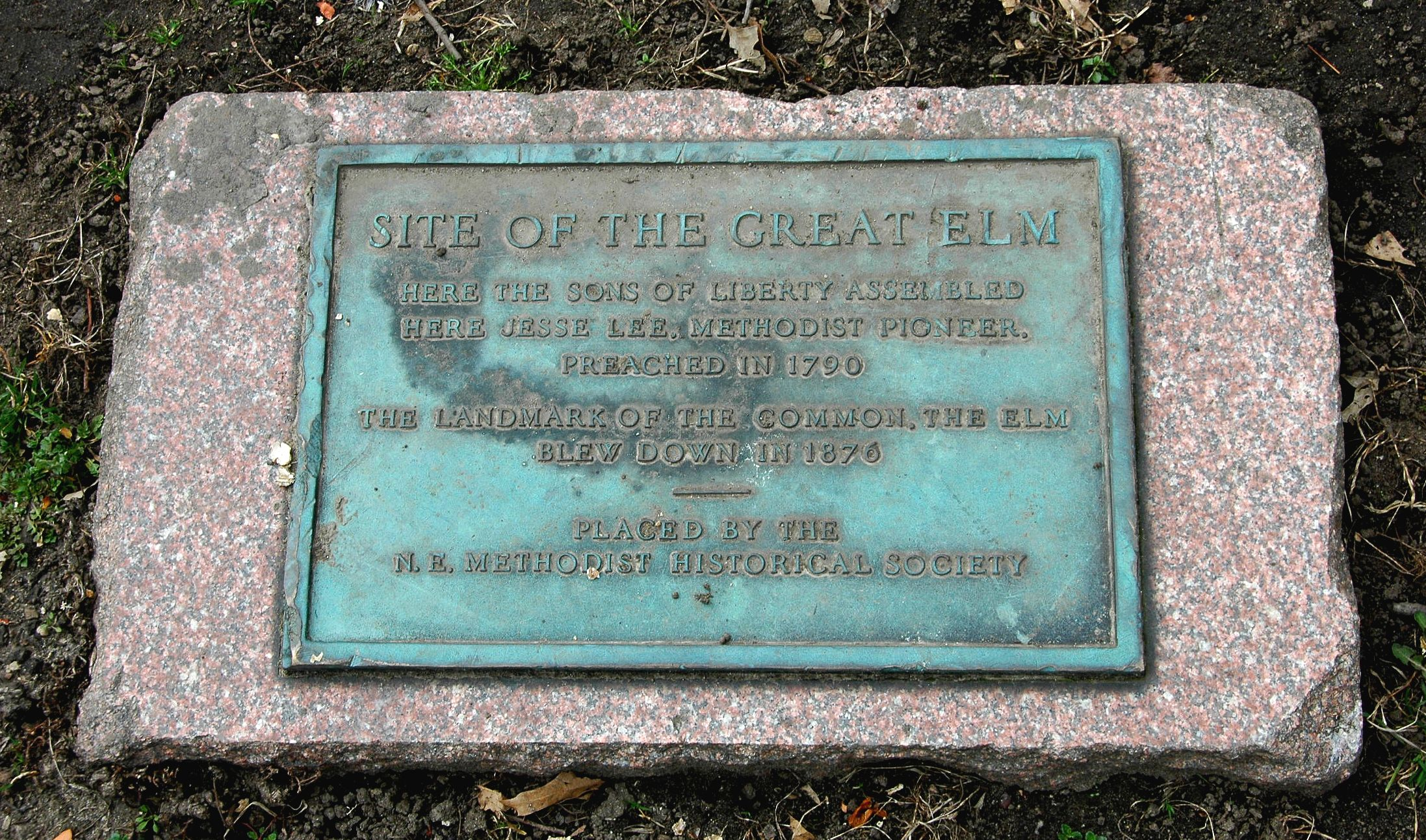
Plaque to the Great Elm

The loss of the Great Elm had a tremendous impact on the city's residents. In the same year the tree fell, an author known simply as Waterston wrote an essay on its legacy. Although a bit overdramatic, he noted how "thousands of citizens gathered earnestly around, eager to take one farewell look, and to gain, if it should be possible, some memento, however, slight, of this historic and patriarchal representative of the Past."

City leaders also sought to pay tribute to the now lost venerable icon. The Mayor of Boston, Samuel Cobb, released a statement on a unique medium: pieces of wood from the tree that had been transformed into a thin veneer. He used this platform to celebrate the tree's legacy to the community. Under a majestic image of the Great Elm, the mayor summarized the loss of an icon: "As the Great Elm on Boston Common, with an age in years outdating the settlement of the Town, was destined to fall, by wind and decay, during the time it was under my guardianship, as the Mayor of the City, I can do no less than give the attestation of my name to certify, that this is a perfectly correct view of it, just before it fell, and that the surface on which the photograph is presented is a veneer from the wood of the veritable and venerable Tree. March 31, 1876, Samuel C Cobb, Mayor of Boston."

Modern visitors are still drawn to the location of The Great Elm. Rather than being encountered by an immense piece of nature, visitors in the twenty-first century now encounter a small plaque (photo shown above) that celebrates the legacy and importance of the Great Elm Tree to the Boston Common. The simple plaque rests in stark contrast to the dominance of the Great Elm. It shares that this was the "site of the Great Elm: here the Sons of Liberty assembled; Here Jesse Lee, Methodist Pioneer, Preached in 1790. The landmark of the Common, the Elm blew down in 1876. Placed by the N.E. Methodist Historical Society."

== See also ==
- List of elm trees
- List of individual trees

=== Further reading ===
- A Friend of Improvement. The Boston Common, or Rural Walks in Cities (Boston: George W. Light, 1838).
- Adams, Nehemiah. Boston Common (Boston: William D. Ticknor and H.B. Williams, 1842).
- Ayer, Mary Farwell. Boston Common in Colonial and Provincial Days (Boston: Privately Printed, 1903).
- Ayer, Mary Farwell. Early Days on Boston Common (Boston: Privately Printed, 1910).
- Barber, Samuel. Boston Common: A Diary of Notable Events, Incidents, and Neighboring Occurrences (Boston: Christopher Publishing House, 1916).
- Drake, Samuel Adams. Old Landmarks and Historic Personages of Boston (Boston: James R. Osgood and Co., 1873), p. 331.
- Friends of the Public Garden. Images of America: Boston Common (Charleston: Arcadia Publishing, 2005).
- Howe, Mark Antony DeWolfe. Boston Common: Scenes from Four Centuries (Cambridge: The Riverside Press, 1910).
- Warren, J.C. The Great Tree on Boston Common (Boston: John Wilson & Son, 1855).
- Waterston. Story of the Great Elm (Boston: John Wilson and Son, 1876).
