= Preston Park Velodrome =

Venue in Brighton, England since 1887

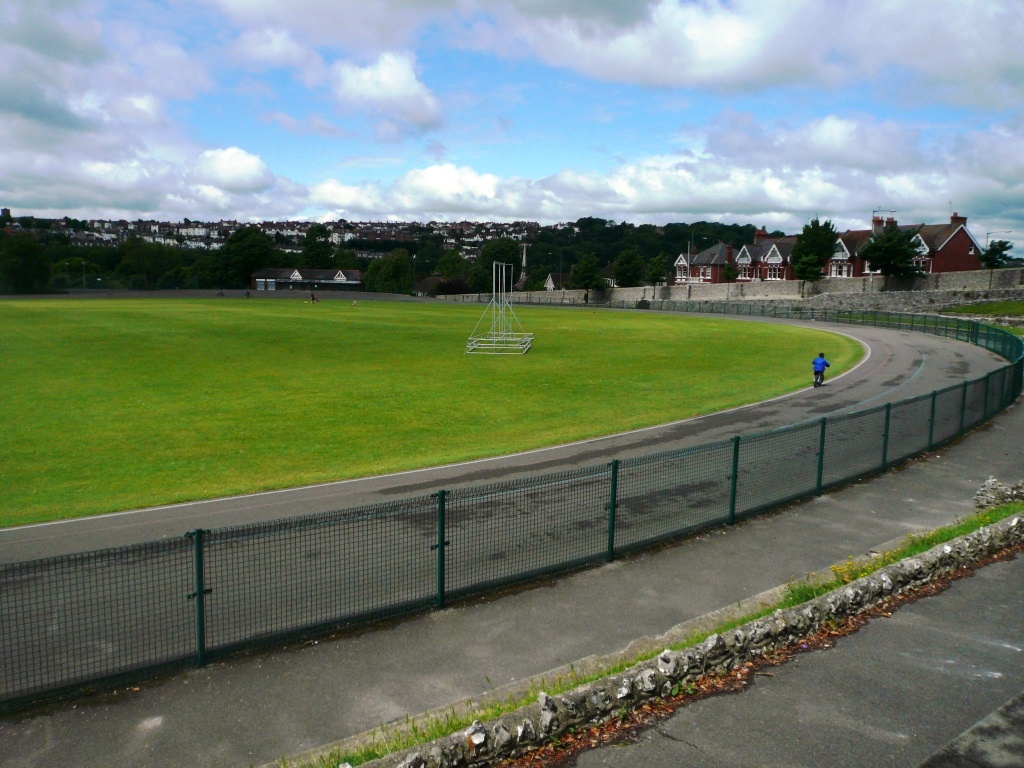
- Preston Park Velodrome
- Interactive map of Preston Park Velodrome
- Address: The Ride, Brighton, BN1 6LA
- Coordinates: 50°50′35.54″N 0°08′56.45″W
- Owner: Brighton and Hove City Council
- Seating type: Open air grandstand, flint-edged stone seating
- Type: Velodrome
- Event: Sporting events
- Surface: Tarmacadam
- Record attendance: 10,000
- Field size: 579m length (1900 feet)

Construction
- Opened: 30 May 1887
- Renovated: 1936, 2015

Tenants
- Preston Park Youth Cycling Club; Sussex Cycle Racing League

The Preston Park Velodrome is an outdoor velodrome in the north-east corner of Preston Park in Brighton, United Kingdom. It is the oldest velodrome in the United Kingdom having been opened on 30 May 1887. It is also thought to be the oldest, working velodrome in the world that still uses its original track design. The only known older working velodrome is the Andreasried Velodrome in Erfurt, Germany which originally opened in 1885 but was later reconfigured from 333m to 250m in 2006-07.

== Characteristics ==
As well as being the first track in the UK, Preston Park is also the longest at 579m (1900 feet). It is one of the few velodromes which is not the normal oval shape, instead comprising four straights and two slightly banked corners. This is because there were no international velodrome standards until after Olympic track cycling grew in popularity after 1900, so early velodromes from the late 1800s came in all shapes and sizes.

== Site of Special Historic Interest ==
The velodrome and cricket ground are included in land registered under the Historic Buildings and Ancient Monuments Act 1953 within the Register of Historic Parks and Gardens by Historic England for its special historic interest. The site was listed within the Register as a Grade II Park and Garden on 25 March 1987.

== Construction and improvements ==
=== 1884: Land purchase ===
The velodrome is situated within Preston Park, Brighton, which was opened in 1884 following the purchase by Brighton Corporation of land from V F Bennett-Stanford in 1883 for £50,000. The entire park was laid out by the Corporation's Head Gardener, James Shrives and the Borough Engineer, Philip Lockwood, in 1883-4 and formally opened to the public on 8 November 1884.

=== 1885: Cricket pitch and cinder track laid ===
Construction then moved onto the velodrome and cricket ground site, which was previously a polo ground during the Stanfords' ownership, this use being transferred to the park's playing fields upon purchase by Brighton Corporation. A retaining bank in the north-east corner of the park was constructed to level the site in 1885. The entire arena was dug out by hand by the British Army, the cricket pitch being surrounded by a cinder path.

=== 1887: Cycle track formally opened ===
The cinder path was converted to a cycle track in Spring 1887. The original 'Preston Park Bicycle Track' plans dated March 1887 show where the race start lines were to be placed for the quarter mile, half mile, 1 mile, 5 mile and 10 mile races.

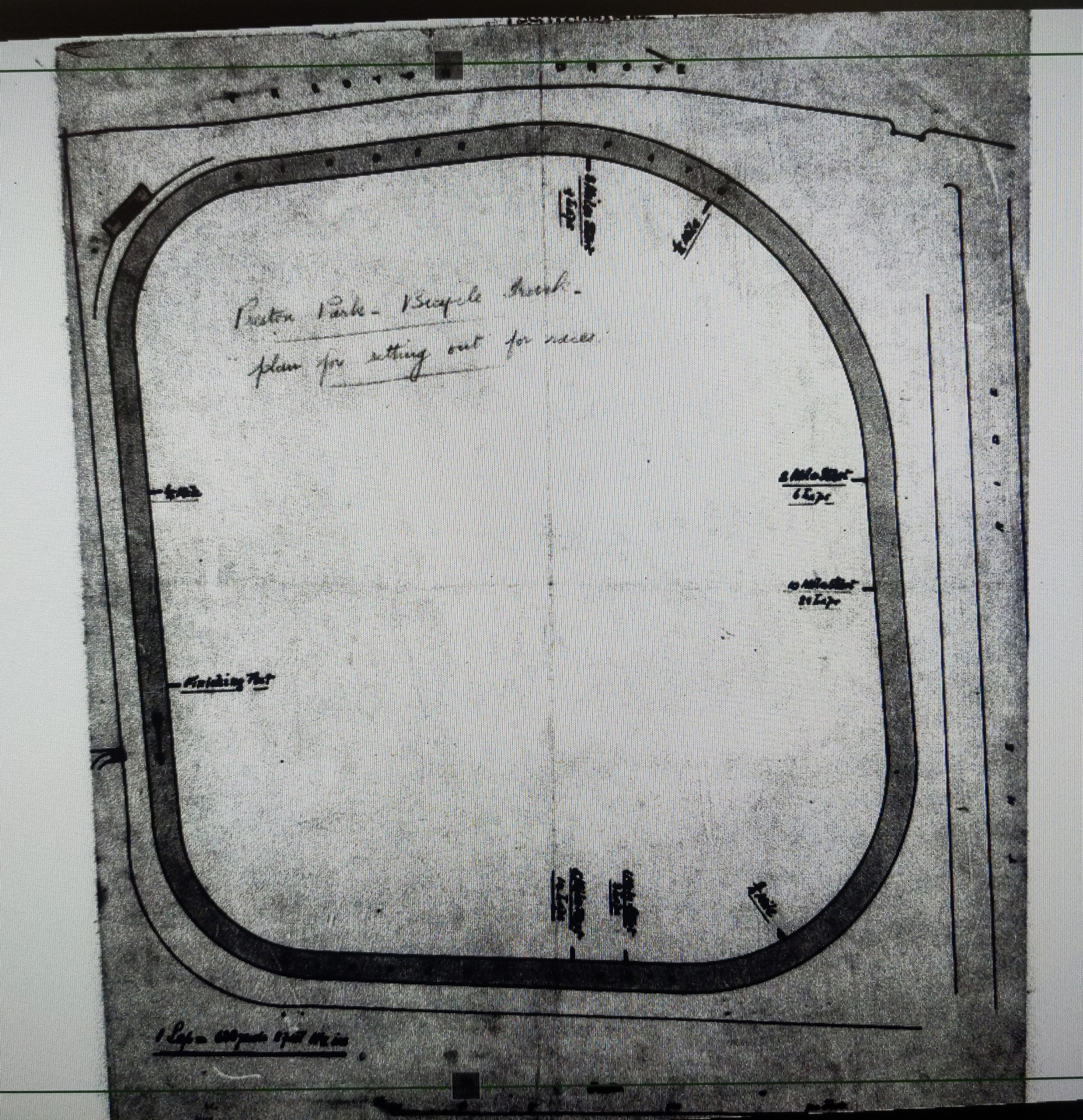

Upon opening in 1887 the sports arena comprised a cricket pitch, surrounding cycle track, pavilion and open air, flint-edged seating for thousands of people. The velodrome was formally opened at a Whit Monday race meeting on 30 May 1887 with races including a 1 mile handicap, 3 mile handicap, half-mile scratch and a 1 mile tricycle handicap, with a 2 shilling entry fee and prizes of up to £7 for first places.

=== 1893: Banking added on final corner ===
In 1893 a concrete retaining wall was erected to support the embankment on the North West corner of the track at a cost of £50.

=== 1930: Wooden grandstand constructed ===
A wooden grandstand with seating for 500 people was opened by mayor Horace Aldrich on 18 October 1930, paid for partly by a gift of Benjamin Saunders.

=== 1936: Cinder track resurfaced with tarmac ===
In 1936 a tarmac surface was added, with the two banked corners added at the same time for safety reasons.

=== 2015: Save Preston Park Cycle Track campaign ===
In 2015 racing was forced to stop following a period when the track fell into general disrepair. Following rider concerns about safety issues it was deemed unsafe for racing by British Cycling in 2015 with the quality of track fencing being the main issue. While this didn't prevent recreational use of the track, it did mean that official racing had to stop, such as the Sussex Cycle Racing League. A successful Save Preston Park Cycle Track campaign was started by cyclist and local Brighton photographer Rupert Rivett, which was supported by former Tour de France cyclist and Team Sky sporting director Sean Yates. This was attended by many riders along with hundreds of supporters from the wider cycling community, demonstrating the value of this important amenity not just to cycling clubs and racing leagues but to local families and recreational cyclists who all use the velodrome regularly.

=== 2016: Track fencing replaced and racing restarts ===
In January 2016 British Cycling announced that it would contribute £110,000 of the £160,000 needed to repair and reopen the track, with the remainder of the required funding coming from Section 106 financial contributions made by developers as part of planning applications. The track reopened for racing in May 2016.

=== Today ===
The arena remains in use for both cricket and cycling to this day, the original Pavilion is still standing and the flint edged seating can still be seen around the North and Eastern sides of the track.

== Tenants ==
=== 1948 to 1967: Prestonville Nomads ===
Prestonville Nomads, a cycling club founded in 1933 were based at the track from 1948 to 1967 and used the Park View Hotel, adjacent to the velodrome on Preston Drove, as their club room.

=== 1998 to present: Preston Park Youth Cycling Club (PPYCC) ===
PPYCC has used the site since its formation in 1998, catering for over 100 young members aged 8 to 18 and meeting between March and October every Saturday morning.

=== Mid-20th Century (advent uncertain) to present: Sussex Cycle Racing League (SCRL) ===
SCRL runs a Wednesday night track league between April and August every year and road circuit races in winter and summer. The track racing, on track bikes with no brakes, usually attracts between 60 and 80 competitors weekly. Competitors commonly fit the age range of 6 years to 60+ years, and racing includes all types of events from scratch races, handicaps and points races to the more unusual keirins, snowballs, Marymoor Crawl and devil-take-the-hindmost contests.

=== 2013 to present: Brighton Tri Club ===
Brighton Tri Club use the velodrome on Saturday mornings before attending ParkRun, also at Preston Park.

A number of other regional cycling clubs regularly hire the velodrome for coaching sessions including Brighton Mitre Cycling Club, East Grinstead Cycling Club and Crawley Wheelers.

== Notable users ==
Geraint Thomas (double Olympic champion, triple world champion and 2018 Tour de France champion) writes about Preston Park Velodrome in his book, The World According to G (2015): "As a kid it was all outdoor tracks, each of them with their own idiosyncrasies... The old stager in Brighton's Preston Park runs noticeably downhill in the last 100 metres. It also has a ten meter section where there is no barrier at the top of the track, just a two-metre drop-off to the walkway below."

Laura Kenny (four times Olympic champion and seven times World Champion) won the Preston Park Youth Omnium in 2007 in the Under 16 age category, having placed 2nd the previous year and later went on to win consecutive Omnium gold medals at the Summer Olympics of 2012 and 2016 .

Reg Harris (five times World Sprint champion and double Olympic silver medallist) raced at the track in the 1950s. On 7 August 1950 Harris rode his last race there before defending his World Sprint title in Belgium the following week. He was reportedly in fine form, beating Belgian sprint champion Franz van Looveren and American sprint champion Jack Heid in each of five encounters and recorded a time of 1 min 15.4 secs in the 1,000 metre, standing-start time trial. He also competed at the track on 4 August 1952, comfortably winning all three of his races against Arie van Vliet (Holland) and Sid Patterson (Australia). Harris returned to Brighton in 1957 in different circumstances as the driver of a 1904 Raleighette vintage car in the annual London to Brighton vintage car run.

== Events ==
The velodrome hosts a full calendar of regional racing events organised via the Sussex Cycle Racing League. At the heart of this are weekly racing events throughout the season from March to August, including the Sussex Cycle Racing League on Wednesday nights, Vets and Women's racing on Friday nights and women's racing on Sunday mornings.

The velodrome is also used for National-level racing and regularly hosts rounds of the National Youth Omnium series, as part of the British Cycling National Track Series, providing opportunities for the country's most promising youth riders. Notable, Laura Kenny (née Trott) placed 1st at Preston Park in 2007 before going on to win consecutive Summer Olympics gold medals in 2012 and 2016.

Historically, attendees of 3000-5000 spectators were a regular occurrence with the largest recorded attendance reaching 8,000 on August 4, 1952 to see world champion Reg Harris in action. Bank Holiday open race meetings were a regular occurrence, typically organised by Brighton Cyclist Club, Brighton Stanley Wanderers Cycling Club or Brighton Mitre Cycling Club, which would feature handicaps and scratch races over half mile, 1 mile and 3 mile distances, often with some athletics races alongside. Some sources put bank holiday race attendances as high as 10,000 spectators.

== Other uses ==
St Peters Cricket Club, formed in 1883, has been using the arena since moving to Preston Park in 1889. In 2013 the club agreed a 20 year lease with Brighton and Hove City Council for both the clubhouse and the upkeep of the two cricket squares. The arena has also been used for athletics meetings, including an England versus France international on 25 July 1925.

== See also ==
- List of cycling tracks and velodromes
