= Preston Twins =

Pair of trees in Brighton, UK

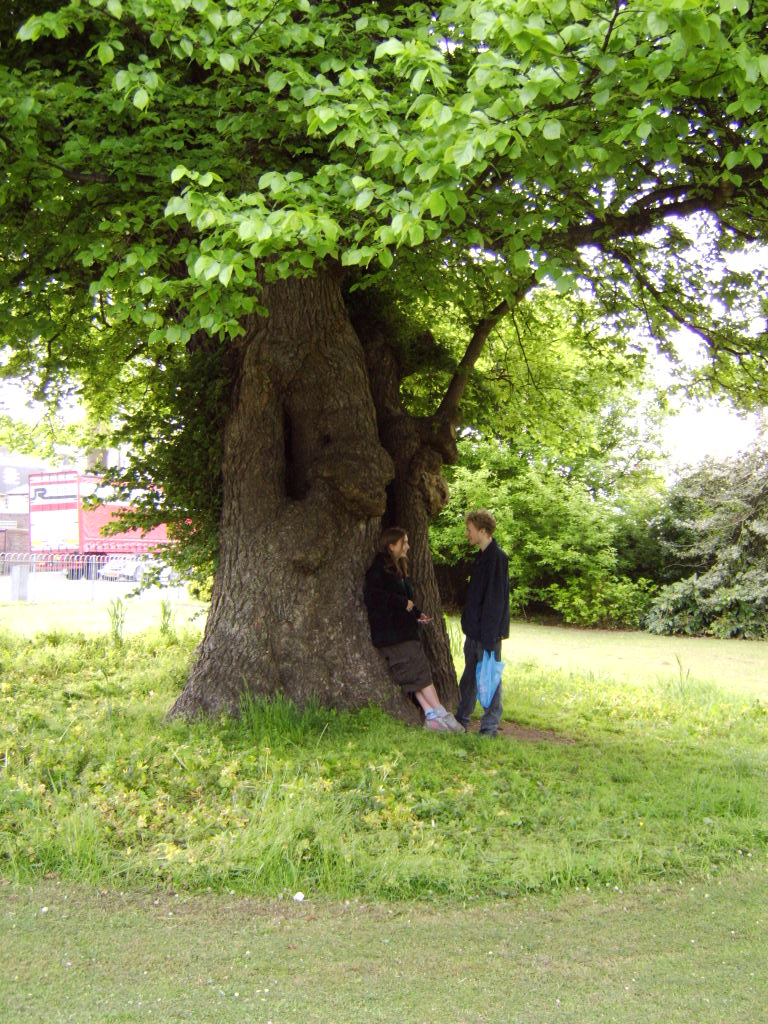
One of the twins, as photographed in 2006

The Preston Twins were a pair of English elm (Ulmus minor 'Atinia') trees that grew in Brighton, England at the northern end of Preston Park. They were planted around 1613 and were "almost certainly" planted as part of a hedgerow. Believed to be among the oldest and largest English elm trees in the world, they reached heights of more than 100 ft (30 m) and widths of 23 ft (7.0 m). An outbreak of Dutch elm disease in England in the late 1960s caused Brighton to enact several measures to protect its 17,000 elm trees, including setting traps for the beetles that spread disease. They also dug trenches between neighboring elms to prevent the disease from passing easily from tree to tree via their root systems. Infected branches were pruned and destroyed in efforts to save trees.

In 2017, a storm caused a large limb to break from the eastern twin, which showed that its trunk was entirely hollow. The tree appeared to respond well to pruning to reduce the weight of its limbs. Prior to its damage and branch loss, it had been the larger of the two trees. The storm-damaged eastern twin became infected by Dutch elm disease, likely in summer of 2018. It did not show any symptoms of infection until the following summer, by which time the disease had already spread to its roots. A trench was immediately dug between the two twins to sever their connecting roots.

In December 2019, the infected tree was cut down. It was hoped that cutting it down would prevent Dutch elm disease from spreading to the other twin. In 2008, a cutting of the eastern twin was planted in Amsterdam.

In 2018, the eastern twin was shortlisted in the Tree of the Year competition.

== See also ==
- List of elm trees
- List of individual trees
