= Preston Park, Brighton =

Public park in Brighton, England

Preston Park
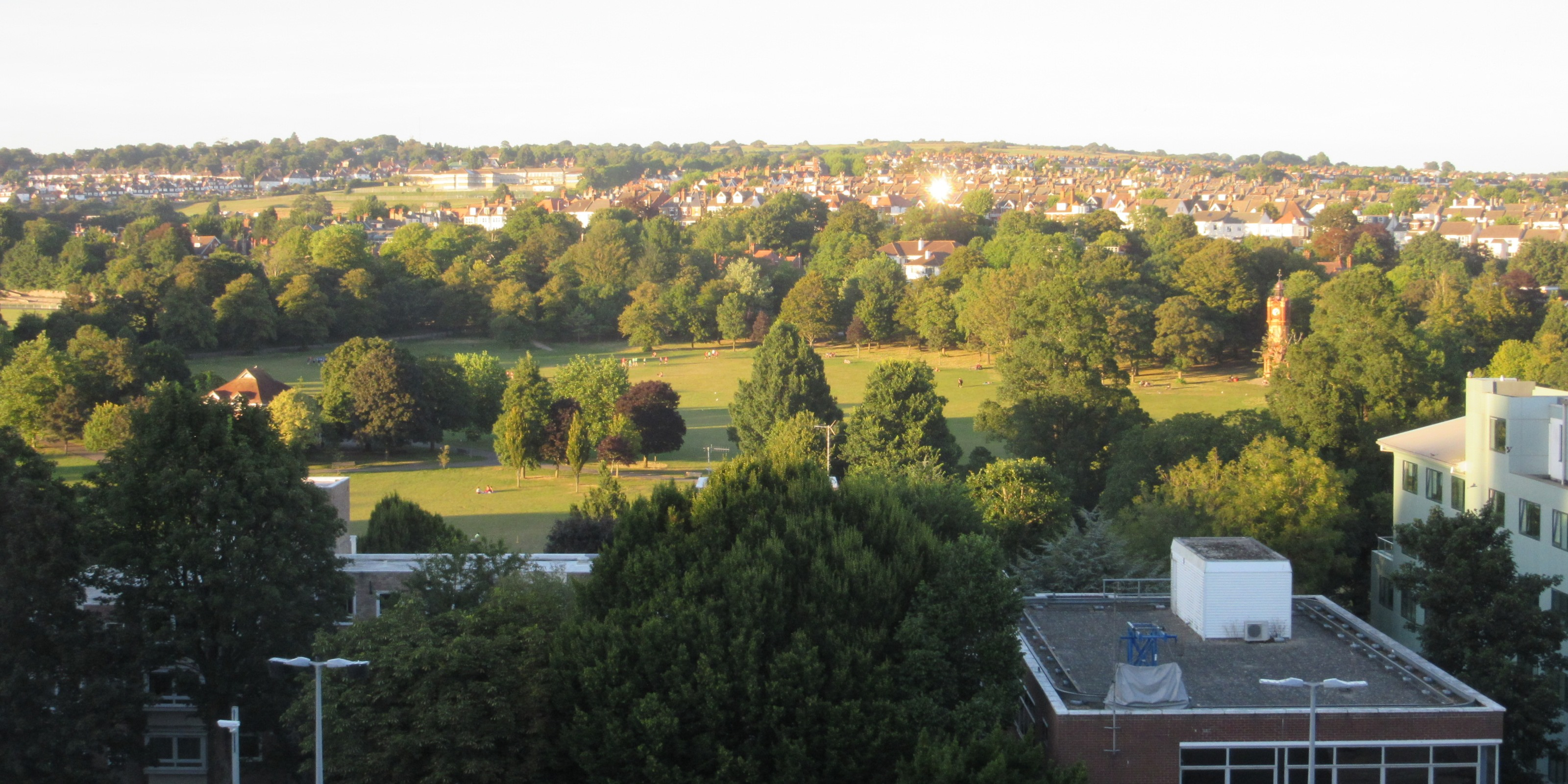
- An eastward view of Preston Park in 2016
- Interactive map of Preston Park
- Type: Public park
- Location: Brighton, England
- Coordinates: 50°50′29″N 00°08′52″W
- Area: 63 acres (25 ha)
- Created: 1884
- Operator: Brighton & Hove City Council
- Status: Open all year

National Register of Historic Parks and Gardens
- Official name: Preston Manor and Preston Park
- Type: Grade II
- Designated: 25 March 1987
- Reference no.: 1000204

Preston Park is a park near Preston Village in the city of Brighton and Hove, East Sussex, England. The park, which covers 63 acres (25 ha), is served by the nearby Preston Park railway station and is listed on the National Register of Historic Parks and Gardens along with the nearby Preston Manor. It is part of the eponymous ward of Preston Park, located north of the city centre, which had a population of 14,911 at the 2011 census.

== Overview ==
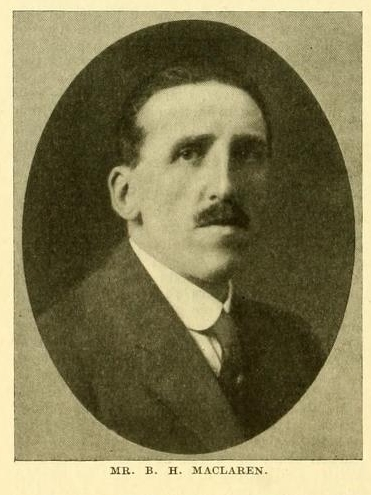
Captain Bertie Hubbard MacLaren conceived the idea of the rock garden

It is one of Brighton's largest parks, with 63 acres (250,000 m^{2}) of lawns, formal borders and rose gardens, bowling greens, tennis courts and a small pond. It was bought in 1883 by Brighton Corporation (then Brighton's local council) from the trustees of Ellen Benett-Stanford who owned the Preston Manor estate and had begun to develop the park as enclosed pleasure grounds. The costs of the purchase (£50,000) and initial layout (£22,868) were funded with a bequest of £70,000 from a local bookmaker, William Edmund Davies in 1879. The park was formally declared open on 8 November 1884.

The Brighton and County Polo Club, started by Lt. Col. Robert McKergow in 1904, was based in Preston Park. An earlier club, the International Gun and Polo Club, founded by George Mashall in 1874, used grounds in Preston, probably Preston Park, though the club itself was based in the Bedford Hotel.

The park remains green throughout the summer because of a non-drinkable underground water source, known as the Wellesbourne, which runs below Preston Park, London Road and The Level. The source dates back many centuries and is often referred to as Brighton's lost river. In 2000, after torrential rain, it rose and caused considerable damage.

The park is host to various annual events including the festival at the end of the Brighton & Hove Pride parade, the start of the Brighton Marathon, a circus during the Brighton Festival, a large starting event for the Take Part sports festival, and, from 20 April 2013, Parkrun, a free 5 km run open to all runners and joggers at 9 am every Saturday.

Opposite the park, across the main London Road, is The Rockery—the largest municipal rock garden in Britain built up the side of a steep railway embankment. Various pathways and streams wind through its grounds. It was originally a wooded area which had been purchased along with the land used for the main park; it was landscaped into its present form in 1935 by Captain B Maclaren. Originally, the area was known as "The Rookery", referring to the tall trees in the former wood which were frequented by rooks. Over time, the name was modified into "The Rockery".

The surrounding neighbourhood is also widely referred to as Preston Park. It is distinct from the further outlying Preston Village.

== Velodrome ==
Preston Park Velodrome, situated in the north-east corner, is the oldest velodrome in the UK having been opened on 12 May 1877, and is the oldest, working velodrome in the world. It was constructed by hand by the British Army and originally had a surface of cinders, replaced in 1936 by a tarmac surface. During the 1950s, Bank Holiday events would attract large crowds to watch riders such as Reg Harris race.

Unlike most modern velodromes which have two straights separated by a curved bend at each end, Preston Park velodrome has four straights of unequal length. A single lap is 579.03 metres (633.23 yards).

In January 2015 British Cycling issued a statement indicating that they had assessed the track as being unfit for racing, and that they would not sanction competition at the velodrome for the summer of 2015. Soon after, a 'Save Preston Park Cycle Track' campaign started. Local cyclist Rupert Rivett started a Facebook community page relating to the campaign which received over 4,000 likes in two days. In January 2016 British Cycling announced that it would contribute £110,000 of the £160,000 needed to repair and reopen the track, with the remainder of the required funding coming from Section 106 financial contributions made by developers as part of planning applications.

== Statue theft ==
In 2007, a statue of athlete Steve Ovett by Peter Webster was stolen by a 44-year-old woman, of no fixed address. The woman was later arrested. Part of the statue, which had been sliced off at the ankle, was recovered but police believe that it had been sold to scrap dealers.

== See also ==
- List of cycling tracks and velodromes
- Preston Twins
