= List of banyan trees in India =

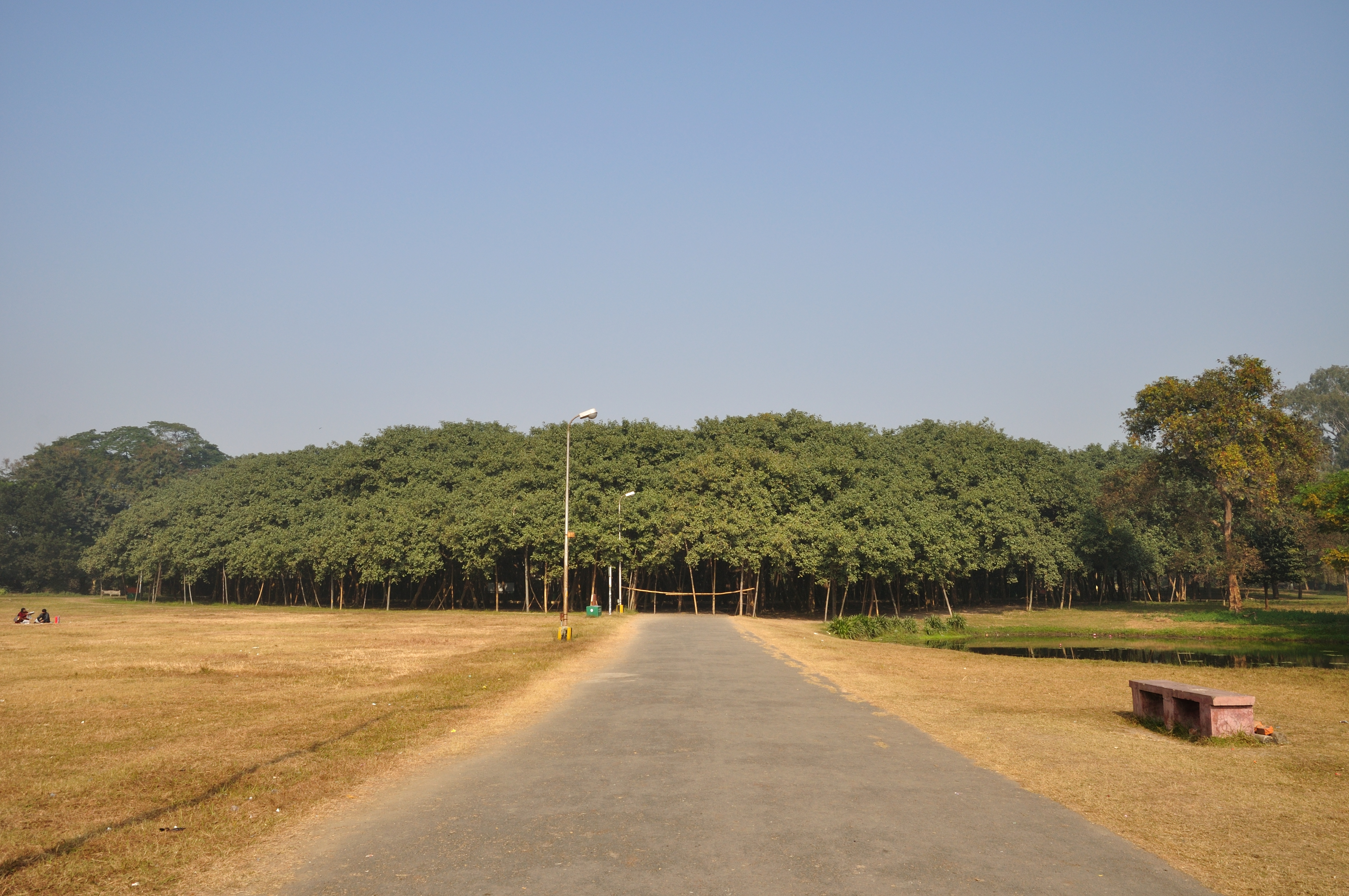
The Great Banyan tree revered by the people of Indian-origin religions such as Hinduism, Buddhism, Jainism, and Sikhism.

The following is a list of notable Banyan trees in India. The Banyan (Ficus benghalensis) is considered holy in several religious traditions of India. It is the National tree of India, and also the state tree of Madhya Pradesh.

The trees listed here are regarded as important or specific by their historical, national, geographical, natural, or mythological context.

- Thimmamma Marrimanu is situated about 35 km from Kadri Lakshmi Narasimha temple in Anantapur district, Andhra Pradesh. Its branches spread over 4 acres, with a canopy of 19,107 square metres. It was recorded as the largest tree specimen in the world in the Guinness Book of World Records in 1989.
- Kabirvad, in Gujarat, is one of the biggest banyan trees in India. Currently the area of its canopy is 17,520 m^{2} (4.33 acres) with a perimeter of 641 m (2,103 ft). Named after the revered poet Kabir, it is one of the most famous destinations for tourists, near Bharuch city in Gujarat.
- The Great Banyan in the botanical garden near Kolkata, is a clonal colony of Indian Banyan with a crown circumference of over 330 meter. The area occupied by the tree is about 18,918 square metres (about 1.89 hectares or 4.67 acres). The present crown of the tree has a circumference of 486 m. and the highest branch rises to 24.5 m, almost as high as the Gateway of India. At present the tree has 3772 aerial roots reaching down to the ground as prop roots.
- Pillalamarri, 800-year-old banyan tree located in Mahabubnagar, Telangana, India. The tree is spread over an area of 4 acres, according to archeological survey of India it is the third largest in India.
- The 450-year-old giant Banyan tree at Adyar in Chennai, Tamil Nadu, India, in the grounds of the Theosophical Society headquarters under which people listened to discourses by intellectuals including J. Krishnamurti, Annie Besant and Maria Montessori.
- Dodda Alada Mara, the 400-year-old tree also called the Big Banyan Tree at Ramohalli, Bengaluru, Karnataka. It is 95 feet tall and spreads across an area of 3 acres. This tree is located 28 km from Bengaluru.
- Chosath Yogini temple: a 1000 year old Banyan tree, located in Maharajpur, Sagar, Madhya Pradesh (India), spread in 50000 square feet, the biggest banyan tree of central India
- A huge banyan tree spread across 2.5 acres of land inside the Pirbaba's Taroda sacred grove located in Amravati district, Maharashtra. The tree is considered sacred.
- Cholti Kheri sacred tree in Fatehgarh Sahib district of Punjab.
- Pemgiri, with 3.5 acres spread it is largest banyan tree of Maharashtra, 16 km west from Sangamner on Pune-Nasik Highway
- Dhalpal banyan tree. Located in CoochBehar district, WestBengal.

== See also ==
- Sacred related
  - Sacred trees
    - Balete tree, largest in Philippines
    - Bodhi Tree
    - Sacred groves
    - Sacred groves of India
    - Tree spirit
    - Tree worship
  - Sacred mountains
  - Sacred natural site
  - Sacred rivers
  - Sacred site
- General
  - List of individual trees
  - List of types of formally designated forests
  - Superlative trees
  - Tree hugger (disambiguation)
  - World mountain
