= Pillalamarri =

800-year-old banyan tree in India

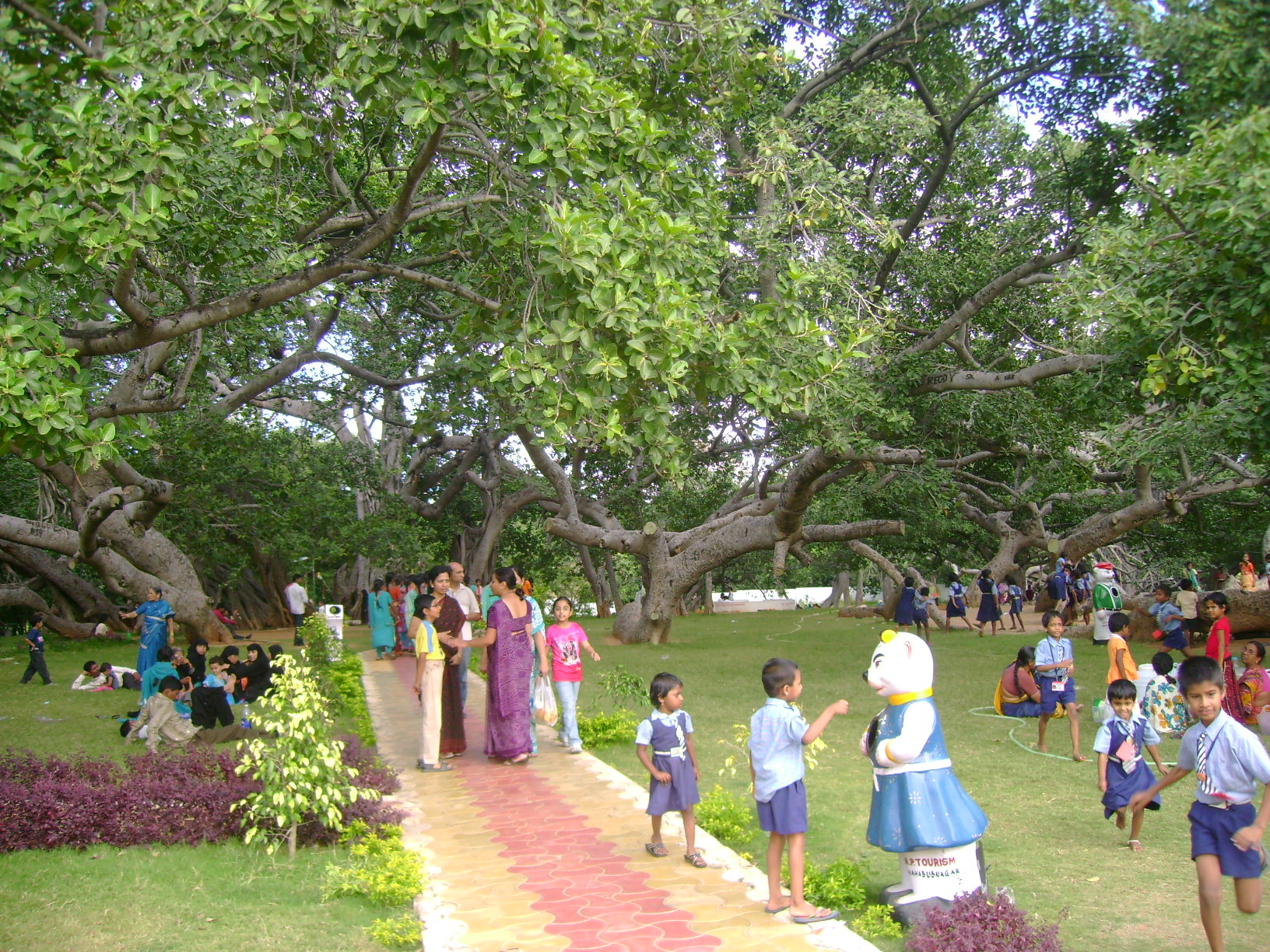
- Pillala Marri
- Species: Banyan (Ficus benghalensis)
- Location: Mahbubnagar, Telangana, India
- Date seeded: 13th century CE

Pillalamarri (Children's Banyan) or Peerlamarri (Saints Banyan) is an 800-year-old banyan tree located in Mahbubnagar, Telangana, India. The tree is spread over 4 acres. It is a major tourist attraction located 4 kilometers from Mahbubnagar.

Pillalamarri Banyan Tree is an 800 year old Banyan tree located in Mahabubnagar, Telangana, India.

Pillalamarri Banyan Tree is an 800 year old Banyan tree located in Mahabubnagar, Telangana, India.

Pillalamarri Banyan Tree is an 800 year old Banyan tree located in Mahabubnagar, Telangana, India.

Pillalamarri Banyan Tree is an 800 year old Banyan tree located in Mahabubnagar, Telangana, India.

Pillalamarri Banyan Tree is an 800 year old Banyan tree located in Mahabubnagar, Telangana, India.

The sightseeing is partially closed as of November 2018 because of the treatment being carried out for the plant. Viewing of the tree can only be done from outside the fence, going inside is closed.

== History ==
The tree is known to have existed since 1200 CE. It had the original main trunk and many prop roots, resembling trunks, giving an appearance of children, hence the name. The main trunk had either died out or unrecognizable among many prop roots. The tree is spread over three acres of land.

There are tombs of two Muslim Sufi saints, Jamal Hussain and Kamal Hussain in the vicinity. Some believe the tombs are under the tree. the shrine is at a slight distance from the tree, with a separate entrance.

There is also a reconstructed Sri Rajarajeswara temple on the premises. The temple was transplanted from the village of Erladinne (erula dinne) on the left bank of the Krishna river, as the village was about to be submerged during construction of the Srisailam reservoir, when the state archaeology department dismantled the temple and moved it to the Pillalamarri complex in 1981. In 1983, the temple was reconstructed on a new foundation. It was originally built in the 16th Century in an architectural style characteristic of Vijayanagara dynasty that ruled in the area.

In 2003, it was announced that there would be a special cover to commemorate the tree.

== Health ==
As of 2019, Pillalamarri is under quarantine, suffering from pest infestation and lack of water.

== Museum ==
The Pillalamarri Tourism Centre on the site has a science museum which houses some of the artifacts found in the Palamuru region. There is a small nursery and a deer park around the great tree, and some movies' scenes are shot there.

== See also ==
- The Great Banyan
- List of Banyan trees in India
- List of individual trees
- List of oldest trees
