= Gollathagudi =

Historic Jain temple in Telangana, India

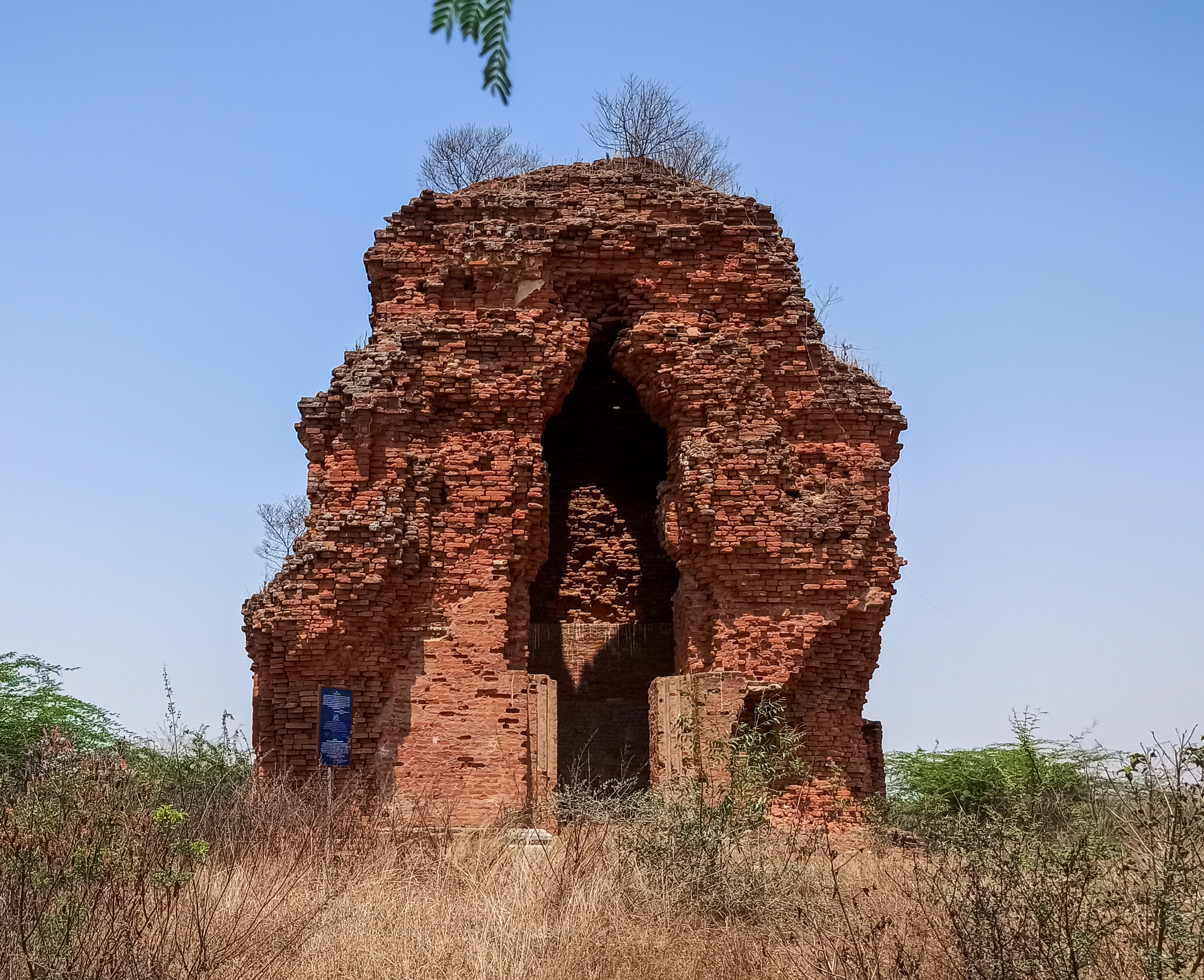
- Ruins of Gollathagudi

- Location within Telangana

Religion
- Affiliation: Jainism
- Deity: Mahavira

Location
- Location: Alvanpalli, Mahabubnagar
- Coordinates: 16°45′34.5″N 78°12′11″E

Architecture
- Type: terracota
- Established: 7th-8th century CE

Gollathagudi, also known as the Alvanpalli Jain Temple, is a ruined Jain temple at Alvanpalli in Jadcherla mandal of Mahabubnagar district, Telangana, India. The archaeological site consists of the remains of a terracota Jain temple complex and associated shrines. Sculptures of Mahavira, architectural remains, stucco figures and other Jain antiquities were excavated from the site.

== Name and location ==
The Telangana government's heritage list identifies the monument as "Jaina Temple (Gollathagudi)" and places it at Alvanpalli in Jadcherla mandal. Modern sources also refer to the monument as the Alvanpalli Jain Temple.

== History ==
Gollathagudi Jain temple dates back to the 7th-8th century CE.

Archaeological investigations indicate that Gollathagudi developed as a complex of Jain religious structures rather than a single isolated shrine. Excavations in 1970–71 uncovered a Jain temple consisting of a shrine, an ardhamandapa and a mandapa, with four smaller shrines situated at the cardinal points around the principal shrine.

A mutilated sculpture of Mahavira discovered within the shrine led the excavators to identify the principal temple with Mahavira. A standing Jain figure in the kayotsarga posture and fragments of a makara torana were also recovered.

== Archaeological excavations ==
=== 1958–59 excavation ===
The site was investigated by the Department of Archaeology, Government of Andhra Pradesh, in 1958–59 under P. Sreenivasachar. Excavations were conducted within and around the ruined structure known as Gollathagudi.

The excavators investigated a square chamber measuring approximately 11 feet 6 inches (3.51 m), with a sculpture positioned against its western wall. An east–west trench revealed the eastern entrance of the temple and three pillar pedestals interpreted as probably belonging to a mandapa. Another trench yielded a fragmentary image, probably representing a Nāga, while a large Jain image was recovered from one of the mounds at the site.

=== 1970–71 excavation ===
Further excavation was undertaken in 1970–71 by the Department of Archaeology and Museums, Government of Andhra Pradesh. Archaeologists exposed a Jain temple consisting of a shrine, ardhamandapa and mandapa, together with four subsidiary shrines positioned at the cardinal points.

The discovery of a mutilated seated image inside the shrine led the excavators to identify the principal temple as being dedicated to Vardhamana Mahavira. Other discoveries included a standing Jain figure in the kayotsarga posture and fragments of a makara torana.

The archaeological investigation also recorded another temple approximately 200 metres (660 ft) north of the excavated complex. This structure was likewise associated with Mahavira and was constructed in brick.

=== 1971–74 excavations ===
Archaeological work continued during subsequent seasons. In 1971–72, the Department of Archaeology excavated several mounds at Gollathagudi as part of the continuing investigation of the site.

Work continued in 1972–73 under the direction of Mohd. Abdul Waheed Khan of the Department of Archaeology, Government of Andhra Pradesh. Excavations exposed the plans of multiple temples and investigated the structural sequence and architectural development of the complex.

During the 1973–74 season, excavators exposed two adjacent temples in front of the brick temple. One contained a damaged seated figure of Mahavira accompanied by the sculpture of a standing devotee. The temple consisted of a garbhagriha (sanctum), antarala and pillared hall. The hall contained devakutas, while two oblong chambers flanked the shrine.

The same season revealed the remains of three additional temples near the brick structure. Finds from the complex included stucco figures, stone carvings, pottery and a mutilated sculpture of a pot-bellied human figure.

== Architecture ==
Gollathagudi is particularly notable for the use of brick in its surviving principal structure. Archaeological investigations revealed a group of Jain temples and associated structures, indicating that the site formed a larger religious complex.

The temple exposed during the 1970–71 excavation consisted of a principal shrine with an ardhamandapa and mandapa, surrounded by four subsidiary shrines at the cardinal points. Structures uncovered during the 1973–74 excavation included a temple consisting of a garbhagriha, antarala and pillared hall, with oblong chambers on either side of the shrine. Stucco figures recovered during the excavations indicate that stucco was used as part of the decoration of the complex.

According to officials of the Telangana Department of Archaeology and Museums quoted by The Hans India, the surviving temple was constructed using large bricks covered with lime plaster and decorated with stucco. The officials associated the decorative technique with the lime-plastic artistic tradition of Amaravati.

== Sculptures and archaeological finds ==
Excavations at Gollathagudi have produced several sculptures identifying the religious character of the complex. Among the finds was a mutilated seated sculpture of Mahavira discovered within the principal shrine and a standing Jain figure represented in the kayotsarga posture. A further damaged seated figure of Mahavira was discovered during the 1973–74 excavations. Other archaeological finds included fragments of a makara torana, stucco figures, stone carvings and pottery.

According to The Hans India, sculptures of Mahavira and Parshvanatha, along with other antiquities recovered from the site, were transferred for preservation to the museum at Pillalamarri and the State Museum in Hyderabad.

== Conservation ==
Gollathagudi is a state-protected monument. The Telangana Heritage (Protection, Preservation, Conservation and Maintenance) Act, 2017 includes "Jaina Temple (Gollathagudi)" in the statutory list of protected monuments in the state.

The condition of the temple was raised in the Rajya Sabha in July 2017. Member of Parliament Renuka Chowdhury asked the Ministry of Culture whether the government was aware of the dilapidated condition of the brick Jain temple at Alvanpalli and sought information about measures for its restoration and conservation.

In response, Minister of State for Culture Mahesh Sharm] stated that the monument was not protected by the Archaeological Survey of India, but was under the protection of the Department of Archaeology and Museums of the Government of Telangana. The government response also stated that the state archaeology department had constructed a boundary wall around the monument.

A report published by The Hans India in April 2017 described the surviving brick structure as being in a deteriorated condition and exposed to weathering.

== Significance ==
Gollathagudi provides archaeological evidence for Jain religious architecture in the Deccan. Excavations over several seasons revealed multiple Jain shrines, sculptures and architectural fragments, including several representations associated with Mahavira. The surviving brick construction distinguishes the monument from many stone-built medieval religious structures in the region. Officials of the state archaeology department have described it as a rare Jain temple constructed from brick and decorated with lime plaster and stucco.

== See also ==
- Kulpakji
- Jain architecture
- Mahavira
- Parshvanatha
- List of Jain temples
