= Kabirvad =

Notable banyan tree in Gujarat, India

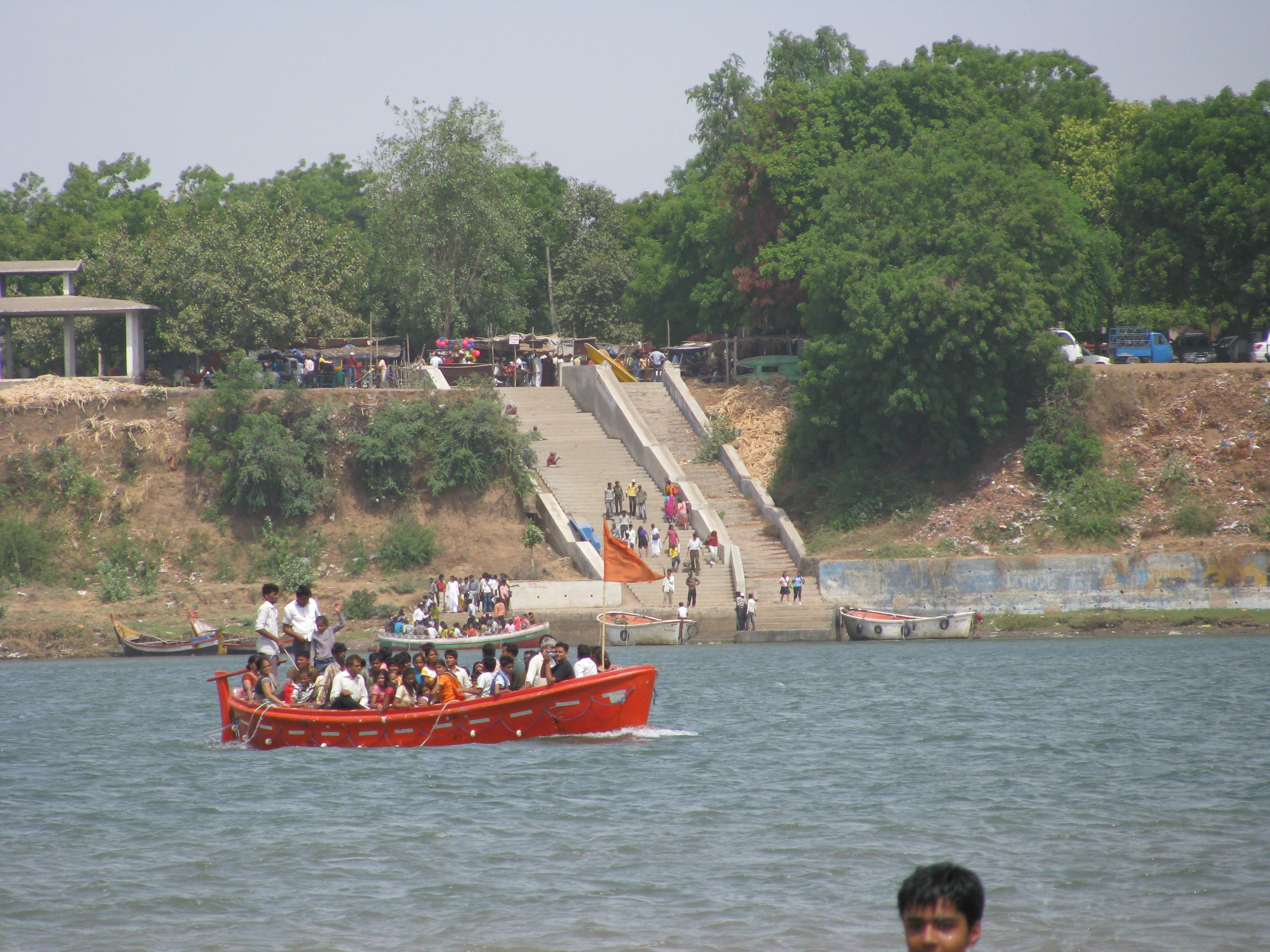
- Hodi Ghat, Kabirvad
- Interactive map of Kabirvad
- Species: Banyan (Ficus benghalensis)
- Location: Kabirvad river island, Bharuch district, Gujarat, India
- Coordinates: 21.7633869°N 73.140089°E
- Custodian: Forest Department, Government of Gujarat

Kabirvad is a banyan tree located on a small river island in the Narmada River, in Bharuch district, Gujarat, India. The tree and place is associated with 15th-century mystic-poet Kabir, and the location includes a temple dedicated to him. The place is a religious site as well as a popular tourist spot.

== Description ==
Nearchus, an admiral of Alexander the Great, described a large specimen on the banks of the Narmada River, possibly Kabirvad. The tree's canopy was so extensive, it sheltered 7,000 men. It was later described by James Forbes (1749–1819) in his Oriental Memoirs (1813–1815) as nearly 610 m (2,000 ft) in circumference, with over 3,000 trunks. Currently, the area of its canopy is 17,520 m^{2} (4.33 acres), with a perimeter of 641 m (2,103 ft).

== Tourism ==
The banyan tree and place, a religious site as well as a popular tourist spot, is associated with 15th-century mystic-poet Kabir, and the location includes a temple dedicated to him.

From Bharuch to Jhanor via Shuklatirth, there is a place known as Kabirmadhi on the bank of the Narmada River. From here, a boat ride brings people to the river island where Kabirvad is located.

=== Legend ===
Local legend has it that there were two Brahmin brothers, Jeeva and Tatva, in the village of Shuklatirth, near Mangleshwar, in Bharuch district, Gujarat. One day, the brothers were inspired to find a true saint. To do so, they planted a dried shoot of a banyan tree in their courtyard and surmised that whichever saint would turn the dried shoot green would be a true saint. In the end, they concluded that Kabir turned the shoot green and therefore was a true saint. According to that legend, the shoot developed into Kabirvad.

== See also ==
- List of banyan trees in India
- List of individual trees
