= Midh Ranjha =

Midh Ranjha مڈھ رانجھا
- Union Council
- Midh Ranjha
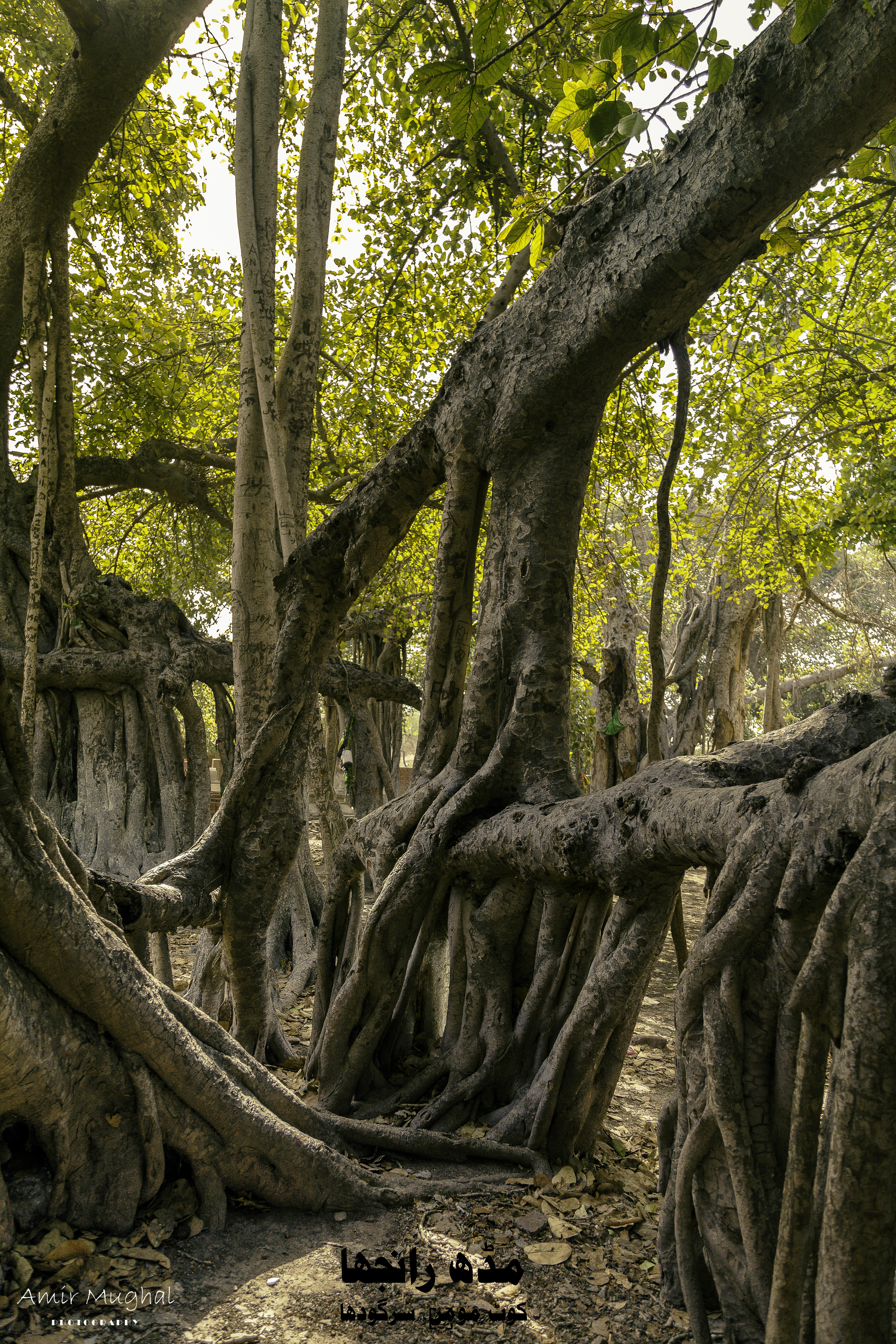
- Midh Ranjha Banyan Tree

- Country: Pakistan
- Province: Punjab
- District: Sargodha District
- Administrative divisions: Kot Momin Tehsil

Population (2017 Census)
  - Total: 10,053
  - Estimate: 10,000
- Time zone: UTC+5 (PST)
- Calling code: 048

Midh Ranjha (Punjabi, Urdu 'مڈھ رانجھا' ) is a village located in Tehsil Kot Momin District Sargodha of Pakistan. It is famous for Pakistan's biggest tree and is associated with the legendary Heer Ranjha story of romantic love. Heer originated in this village. Midh Ranjha is located 21 km (13 mi) from Kot Momin, 58 km (36 mi) from Sargodha city, and 247 km (153 mi) from the capital Islamabad.

== Nearby villages ==
Midh Ranjha is considered as a central point for several villages including Mohriwal, Abal, Dulewala, Badar Ranjha, Kot Ghazi and Thati Kalan and Mahiwal. Important personality from Midh Ranjha is Chaudhary Muhammad Aslam Midhana (late) also known as "King of Kad'dhi(Villages along bank of the river)" by the people of whole area.

== Education ==
Schools of Midh Ranjha:

- Allied School Midh Ranjha Campus
- Arqam Grammar School
- Arqam Inter College
- Crescents School
- Govt. Higher Secondary School Boys & Girls
- Govt Primary School Boys & Girls
- Knowledge City School

== Biggest Banyan Tree of Pakistan ==
Near Midh Ranjha is the largest and oldest banyan tree in Pakistan, with over one thousand roots and covering an area of approximately three acres (1.2 ha). It is situated on the banks of the Chenab river near Abhal-Mohri village, 3.6 km (2.2 mi) from Midh Ranjha. The tree is at least 400 years old, and there is a tradition that it was planted over 600 years ago by Sufi Murtaza Shah with his disciple Baba Roday Shah. The grave of Sufi Murtaza Shah is under the tree. There is a local belief that harm will come to anyone who damages the tree. Many different species of birds have their nests in its branches.

=== Botanical classification ===
Botanically known as Ficus benghalensis, and belonging to the family Moraceae, the banyan tree is a native of south Asia. The fruit is like a small fig and is eaten by some people. It tastes sweeter than fig. The banyan plant is seen sometimes growing from the little wet dust deposits on buildings because birds carry them around for eating. The fruit is red and when ripe gets softer.

== See also ==
- The Great Banyan India
- List of individual trees
- Sahabi Tree
