= Dodda Alada Mara =

Banyan tree in Karnataka, India

Dodda Aalada Mara
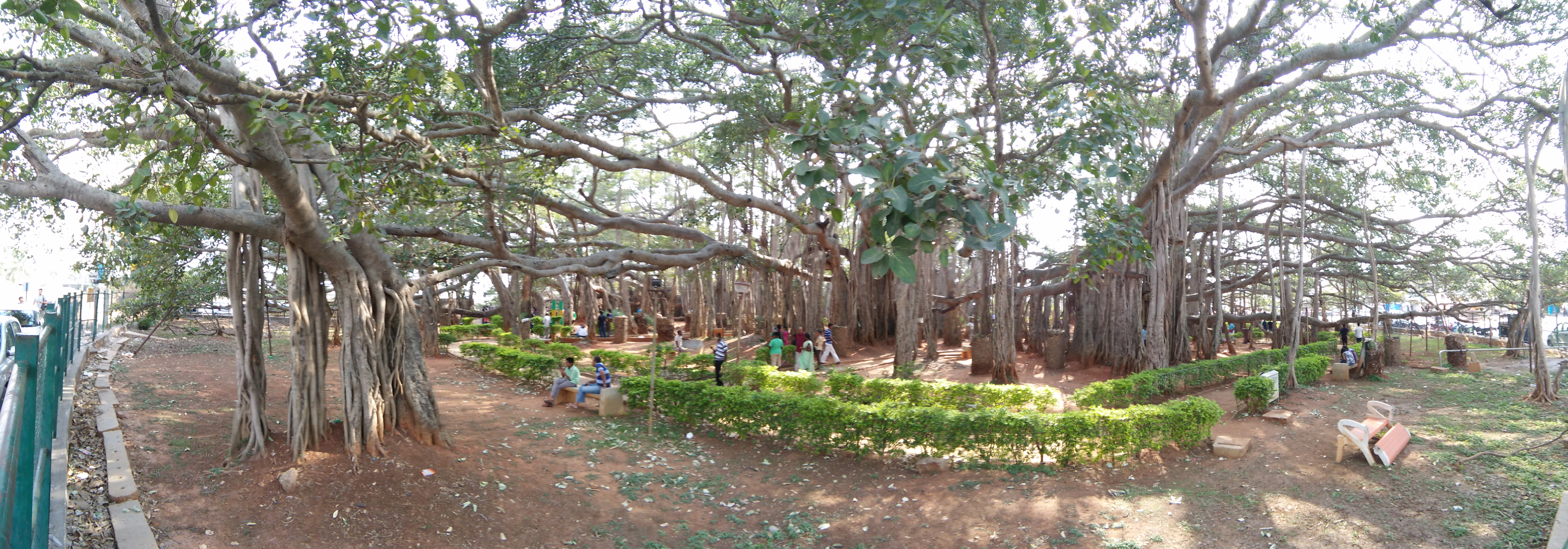
- Roots of the tree
- Interactive map of Dodda Aalada Mara
- Native name: ದೊಡ್ಡ ಆಲದ ಮರ (Kannada)
- Species: Banyan (Ficus benghalensis)
- Location: Kettohalli, Bengaluru Urban, Karnataka, India
- Coordinates: 12°54′34″N 77°23′44″E
- Date seeded: 17th century

The Dodda Aalada Mara, literally translated to Big Banyan Tree, is a giant approximately 400-year-old banyan tree (Ficus benghalensis) located in the village of Kethohalli in the Bengaluru Urban district of Karnataka, India. This single plant covers 3 acres (1.2 ha) and is one of the largest of its kind. In the 2000s, the main root of the tree succumbed to disease, and thus the tree now looks like many different trees. The Dodda Alada Mara is named a heritage tree.

== History and description ==
The tree is believed to be more than 400-years-old. The tree is supported by prop roots after the main trunk fell off, and the roots death in around 2000 due to natural causes. Another report stated that the trunk and roots of the tree contracted a disease sometime in the 2000s. The tree continued to grow in size and had to be pruned multiple times during this time after commuters complained of disturbance by the branches. Parts of the tree fell off also in the 2020s due to heavy rainfall, strong winds and soil erosion.

In 2019, an expert committee headed by an environmentalist, A. N. Yellappa Reddy, was formed to prepare a detailed report for the tree and site's development. In 2020, Karnataka's State's Department of Horticulture and Tourism, which maintains the tree, spent ₹1.5 crore to provide basic amenities at the site for tourists, which included ₹1 crore for the development of the tree. "[I]nfrastructure for the growth of prop roots" was provided "by removing all the hurdles and also dug up pits for harvesting rainwater." In 2022, treatment for arbuscular mycorrhiza was suggested by the Big Banyan Tree Committee, formed to ensure its welfare. The committee also suggested that an additional 2.5 acres (1.0 ha) be acquired to make space for its growth.

The present crown of the tree has a circumference of 250 metres (820 ft), and has 1,359 prop roots, 811 of which touch the ground and 548 hang 10-15 feet above the ground. The girth of each root varies from 7 inches (18 cm) to 3 feet (91 cm).

The climax scenes of Malayalam movie Odiyan was initially planned to be shot around the tree. But was later rescheduled to another location due to not getting shooting permission.

== Tourism ==
The tree is 28 kilometres (17 mi) from Bengaluru, on the Bengaluru – Mysore Road. Buses can be taken from Majestic to Kengeri and then from Kengeri to Dodda Aalada Mara. There are direct buses from K. R. Market to Dodda Alada mara which stops just beside the tree. The tree is the natural home of a large number of monkeys, and tourists are advised to be careful with food, water, camera bags, and anything else that can be snatched away.

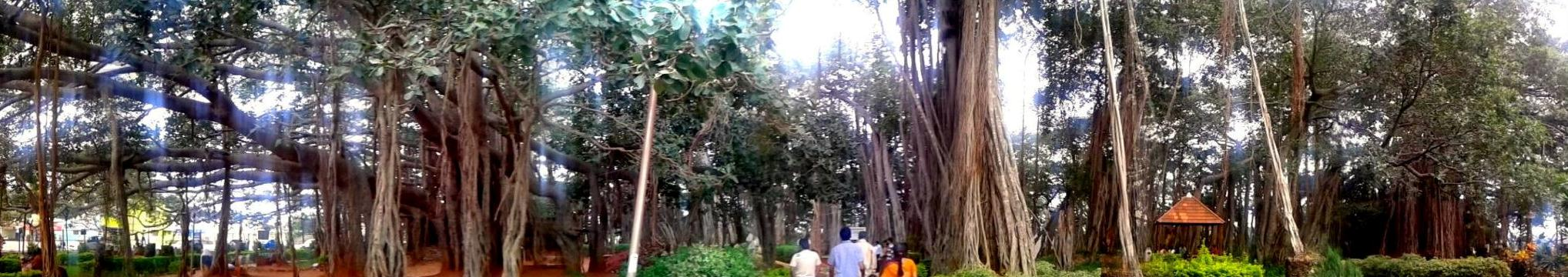
Panorama of Big banyan tree

== Gallery ==
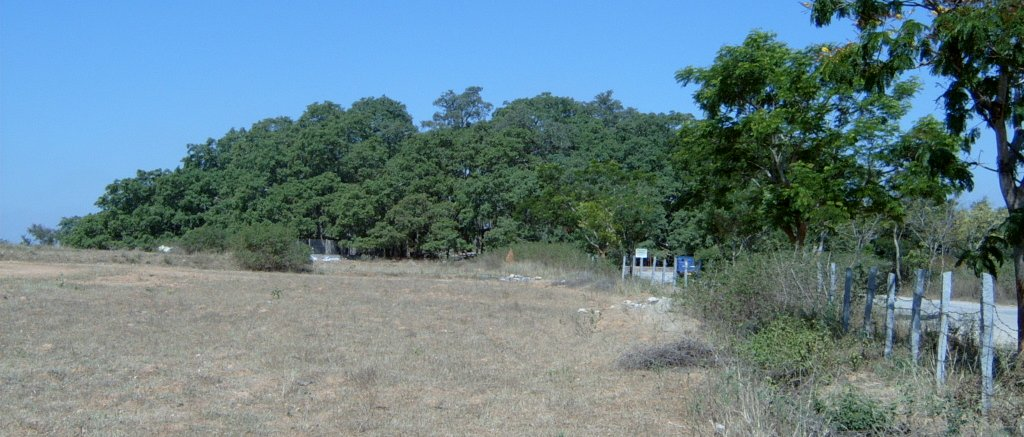
Remote view

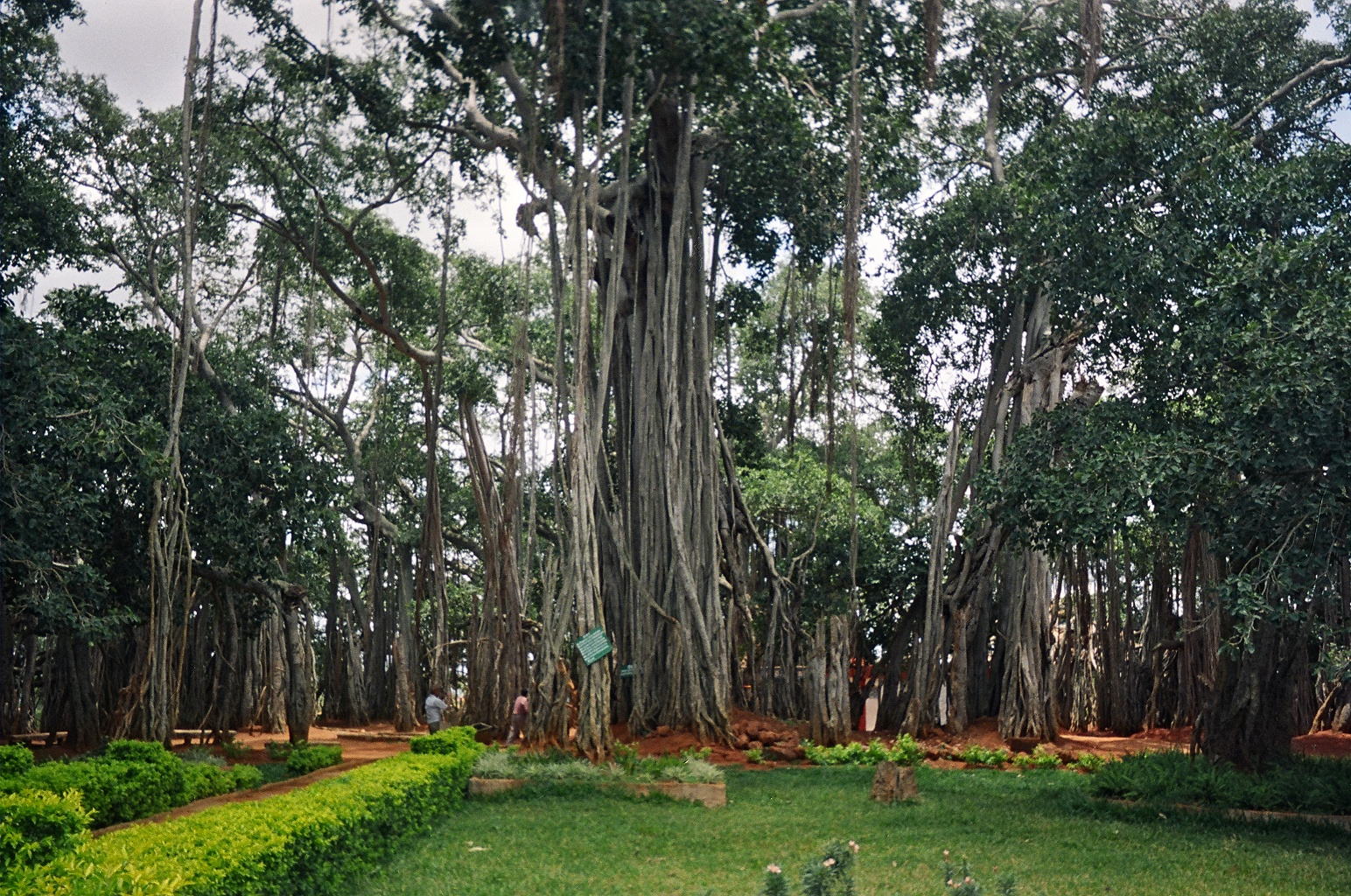

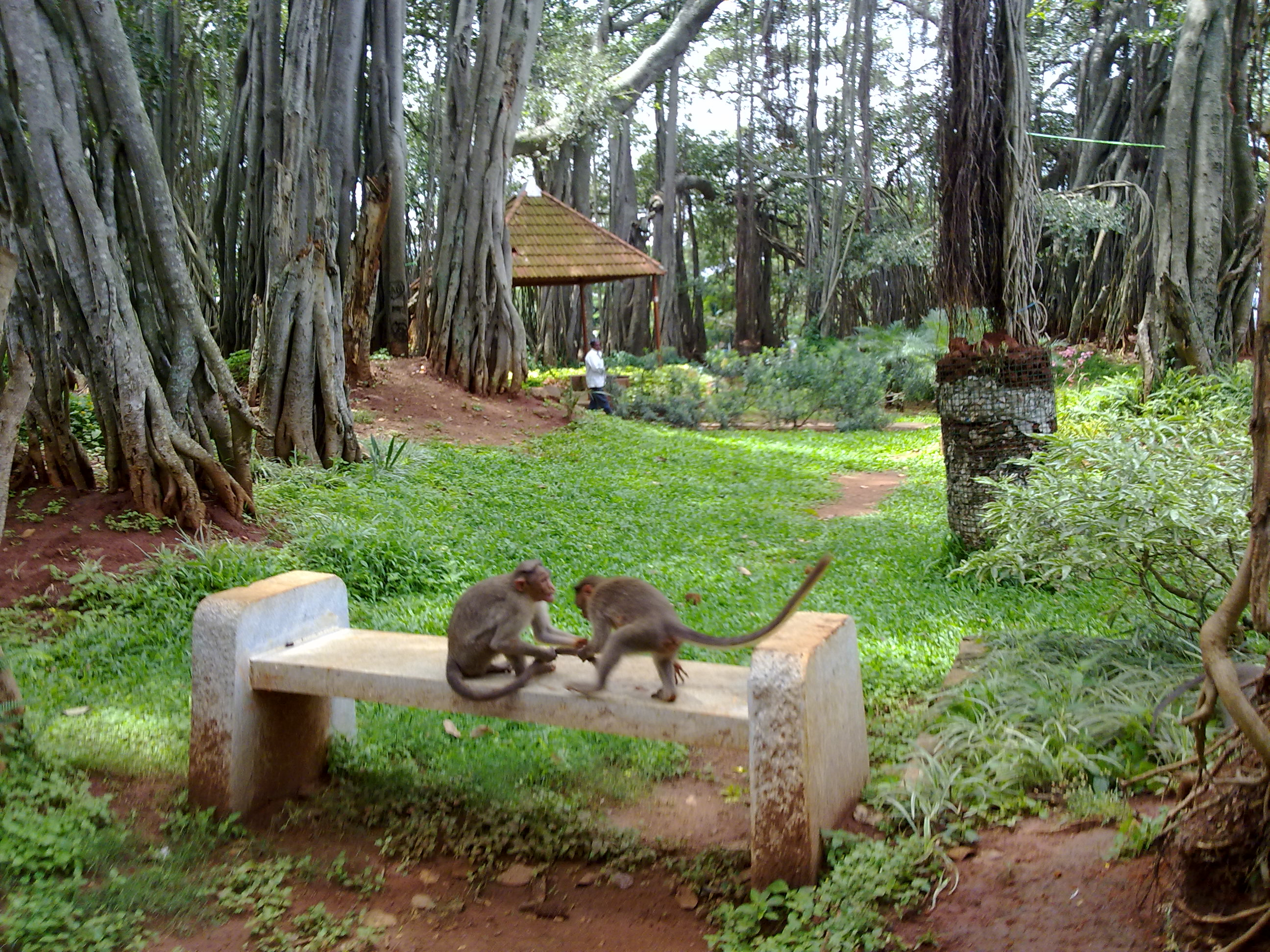
Monkeys in the tree

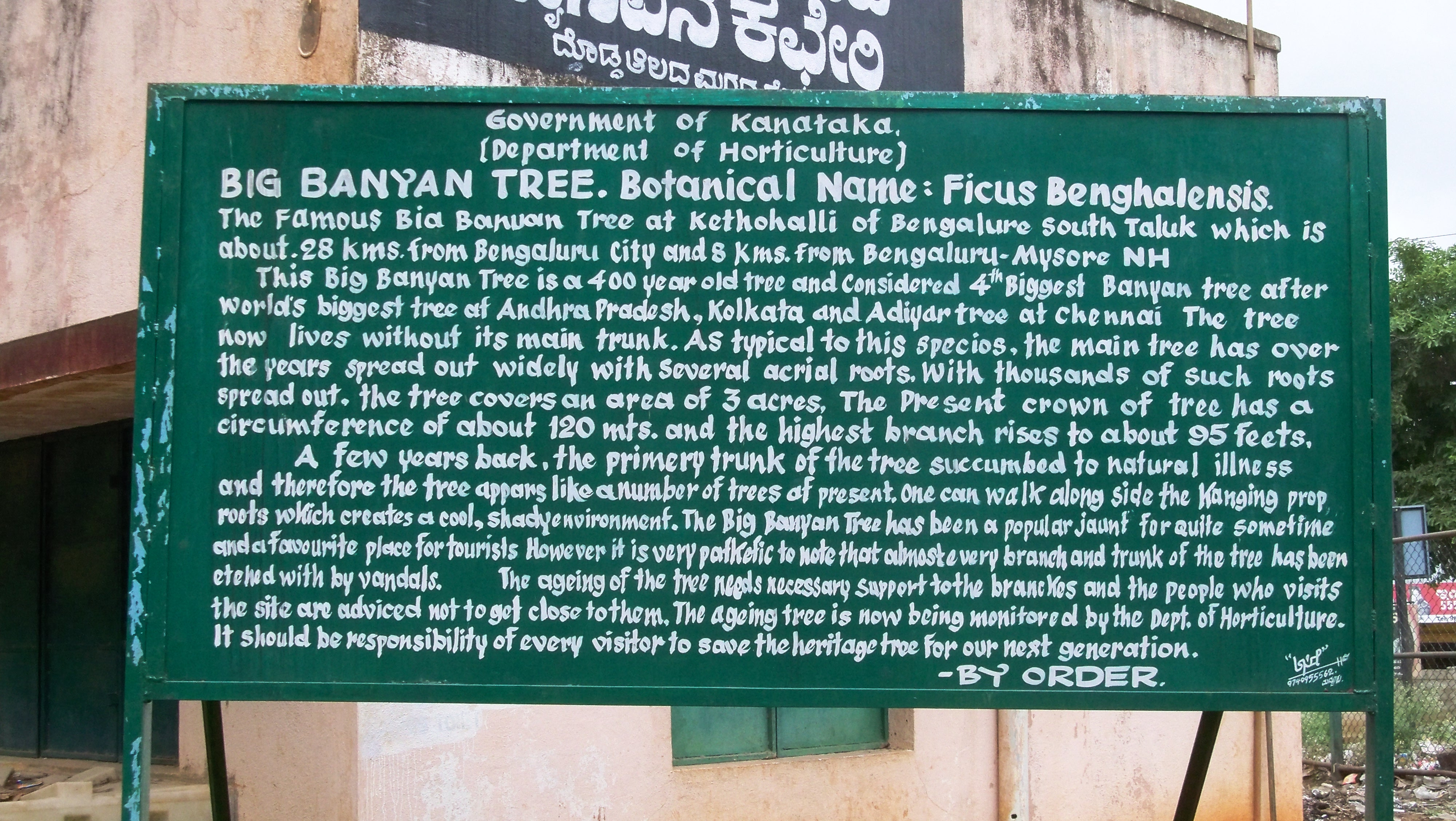
Dodda Alada Mara The Big Banyan tree in Bangalore

== See also ==
- List of Banyan trees in India
- List of individual trees
- Tippagondanahalli Reservoir
- Kanva reservoir
- The Great Banyan
- Savandurga
