= The Great Banyan =

Banyan tree in West Bengal, India

Coordinates: 22.5608°N 88.2868°E

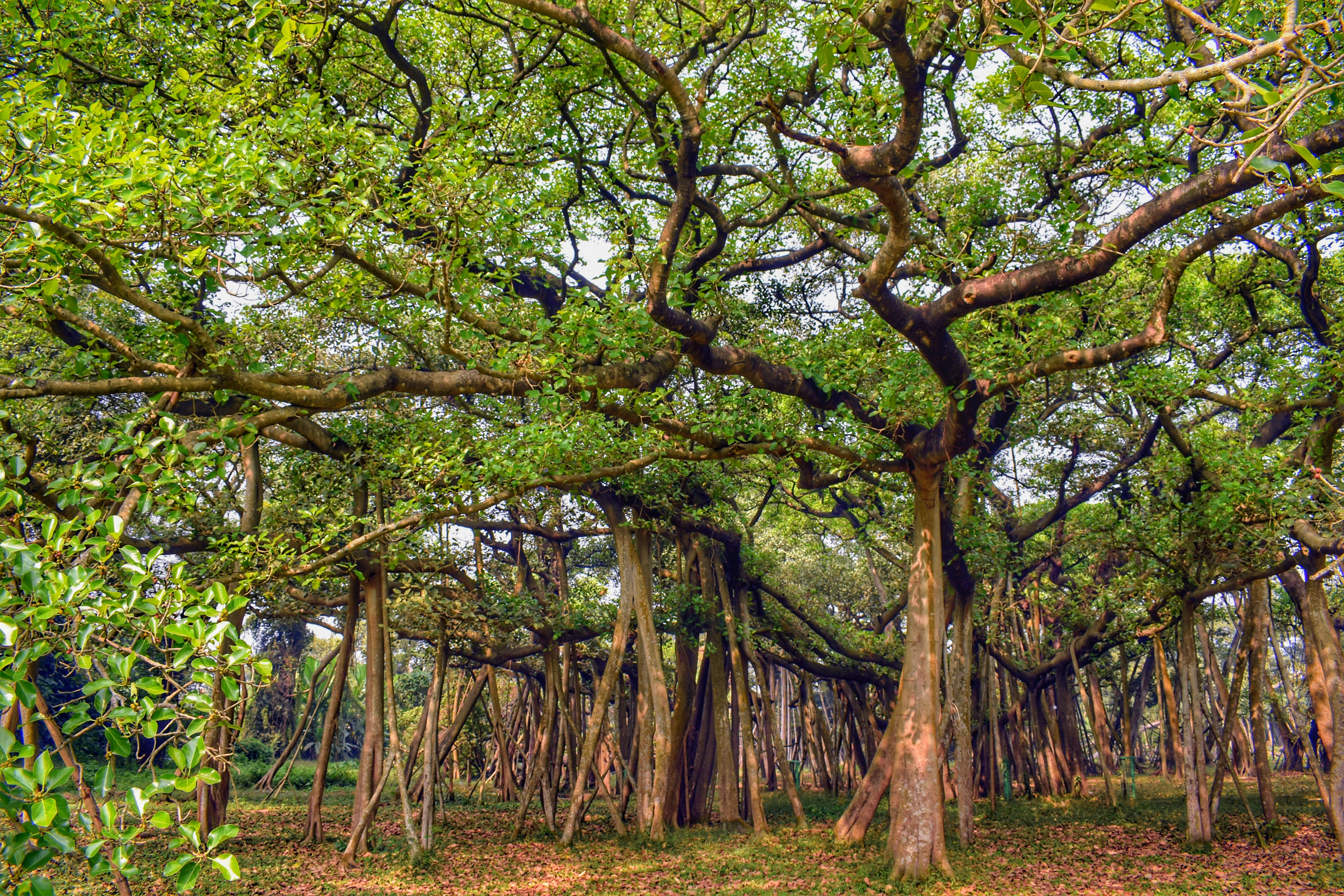
- The Great Banyan Tree
- Interactive map of The Great Banyan
- Species: Banyan (Ficus benghalensis)
- Location: Acharya Jagadish Chandra Bose Indian Botanic Garden, Shibpur, Howrah
- Height: 24 m (79 ft)
- Date seeded: before 1800

The Great Banyan is a banyan tree (Ficus benghalensis) located in Acharya Jagadish Chandra Bose Indian Botanic Garden, Shibpur, Howrah, near Kolkata, India. The great banyan tree draws more visitors to the garden than its collection of exotic plants from five continents. Its main trunk became infected by fungi after it was struck by two cyclones. In 1925, the main trunk was removed to keep the remainder of the tree healthy. A 330-metre-long (1,080 ft) road was built around its circumference, but the tree continues to spread beyond it.

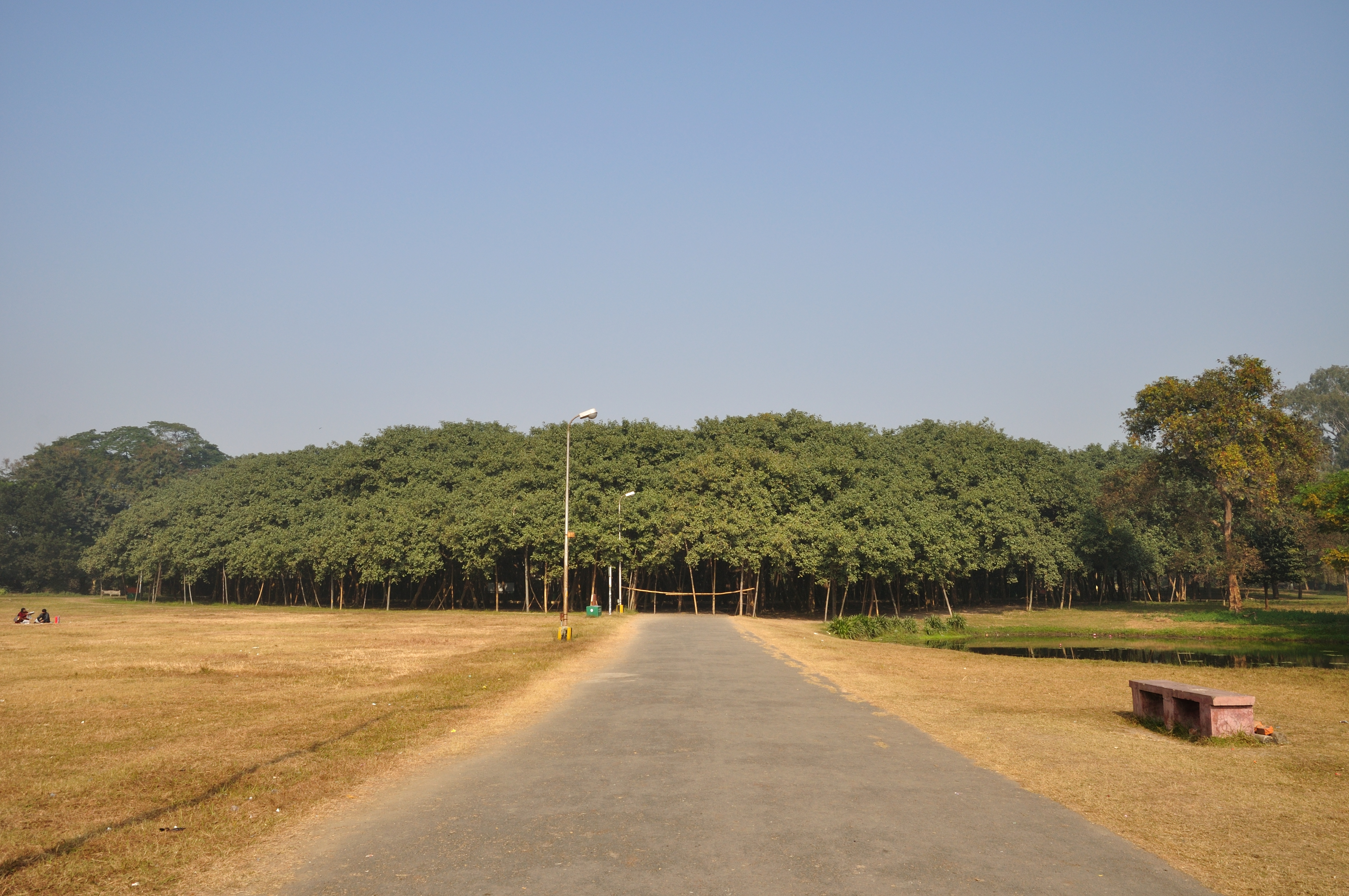
Full expanse of Great Banyan

It was recorded to be the largest tree specimen in the world in the Guinness Book of World Records in 1989.

== Botanical classification ==
Botanically known as Ficus benghalensis, and belonging to the family Moraceae, the tree is a native of India. The fruit is like a small fig and is eaten by some people. It also has a sweeter taste than fig. The banyan plant is sometimes observed growing from the little wet dust deposits on buildings because birds carry them around for eating. The fruit is red and becomes softer when ripe.

== History and description ==
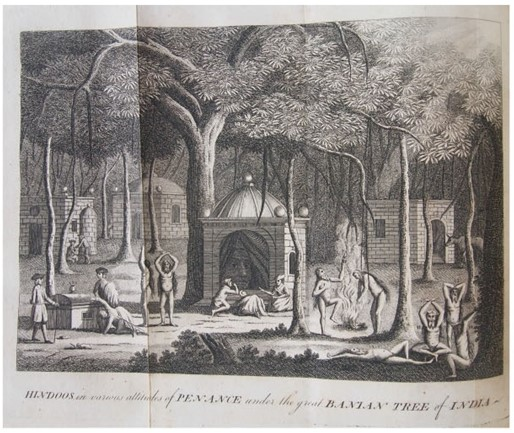
An engraving of the tree published in 1794 by Thomas Maurice

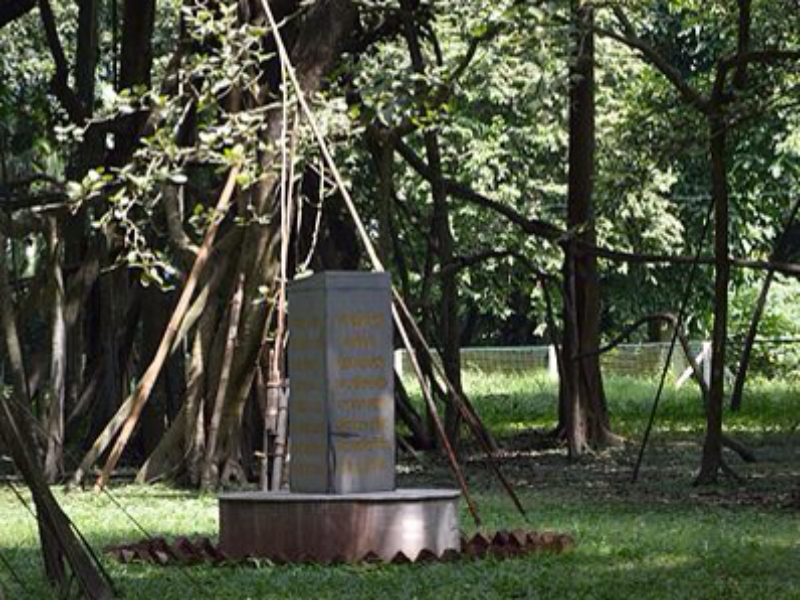
Main Trunk Marker Stone — the original trunk measured 50 feet (15 1/4 m) in diameter before it was damaged in two cyclones (c. 1925), and had to be removed in order to preserve the remainder of the tree.

The Great Banyan tree is believed to be at least 250 years old, and has been referenced in many travel books, going back to at least the nineteenth century. Early travel writers found it to be noteworthy due to its large size and its unusually high number of prop-trunks. It has survived three great cyclones in 1864, 1867, and 2020 when some of its main branches were broken. With its large number of aerial roots, which grow from the branches and run vertically to the ground, The Great Banyan is said to appear more like a dense forest than as an individual tree.

The tree survives without its main trunk, which decayed and had to be removed in 1925. A monument has been constructed to the dead trunk near the tree's center, but the marker is hardly accessible to visitors, who rarely venture within the tree's thick inner tangle of roots and branches. Visitors generally prefer to access only the perimeter of the tree. The area occupied by the tree is about 18,918 square metres (about 1.89 hectares or 4.67 acres). The present crown of the tree has a circumference of 486 m (1,594 ft) and the highest branch rises to 24.5 m (80 ft); it has at present 3772 aerial roots reaching down to the ground as prop roots. Its height is almost equivalent to the Gateway of India.

The tree lost several prop roots when Cyclone Amphan passed through West Bengal on 20 May 2020.

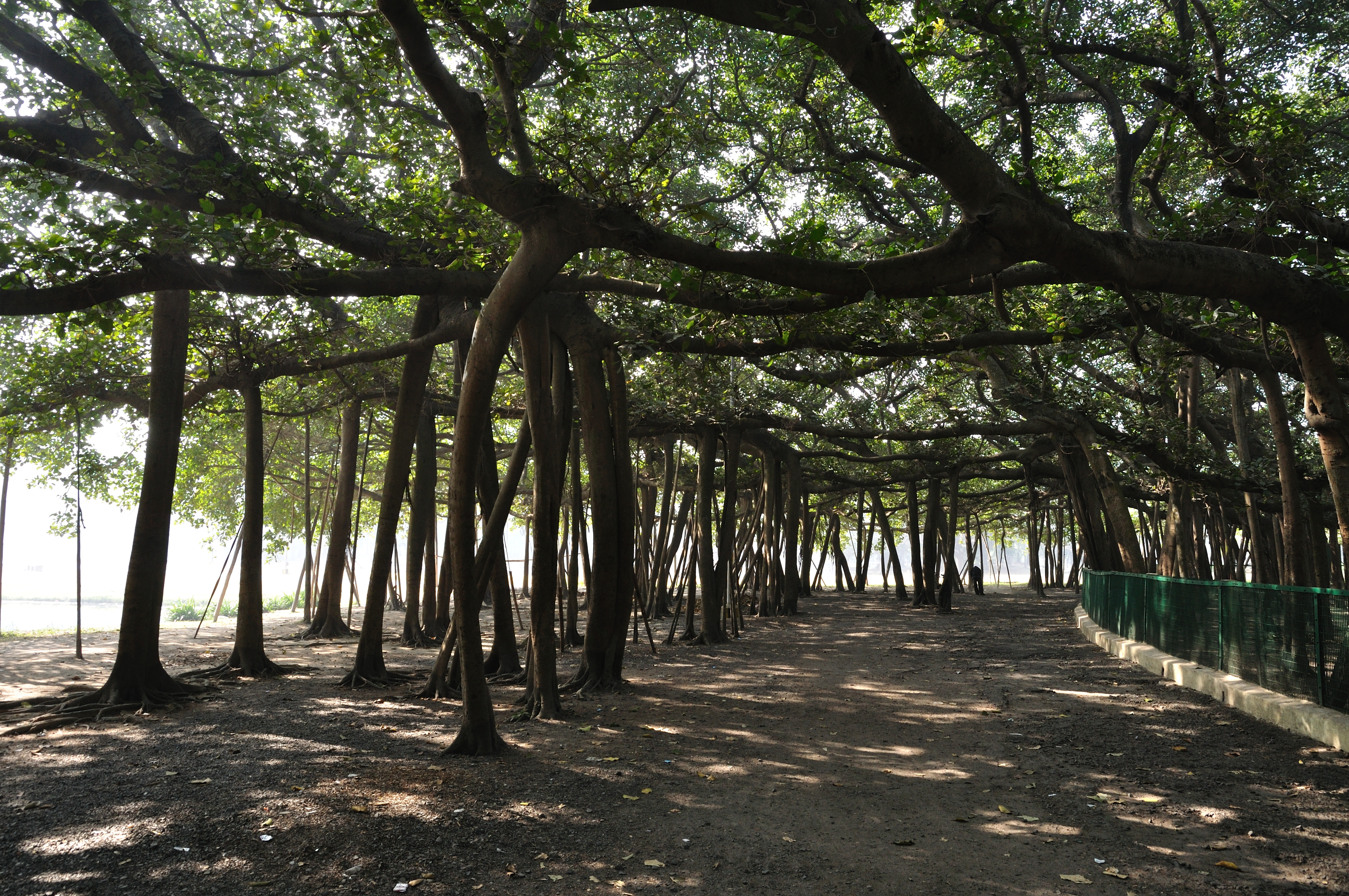

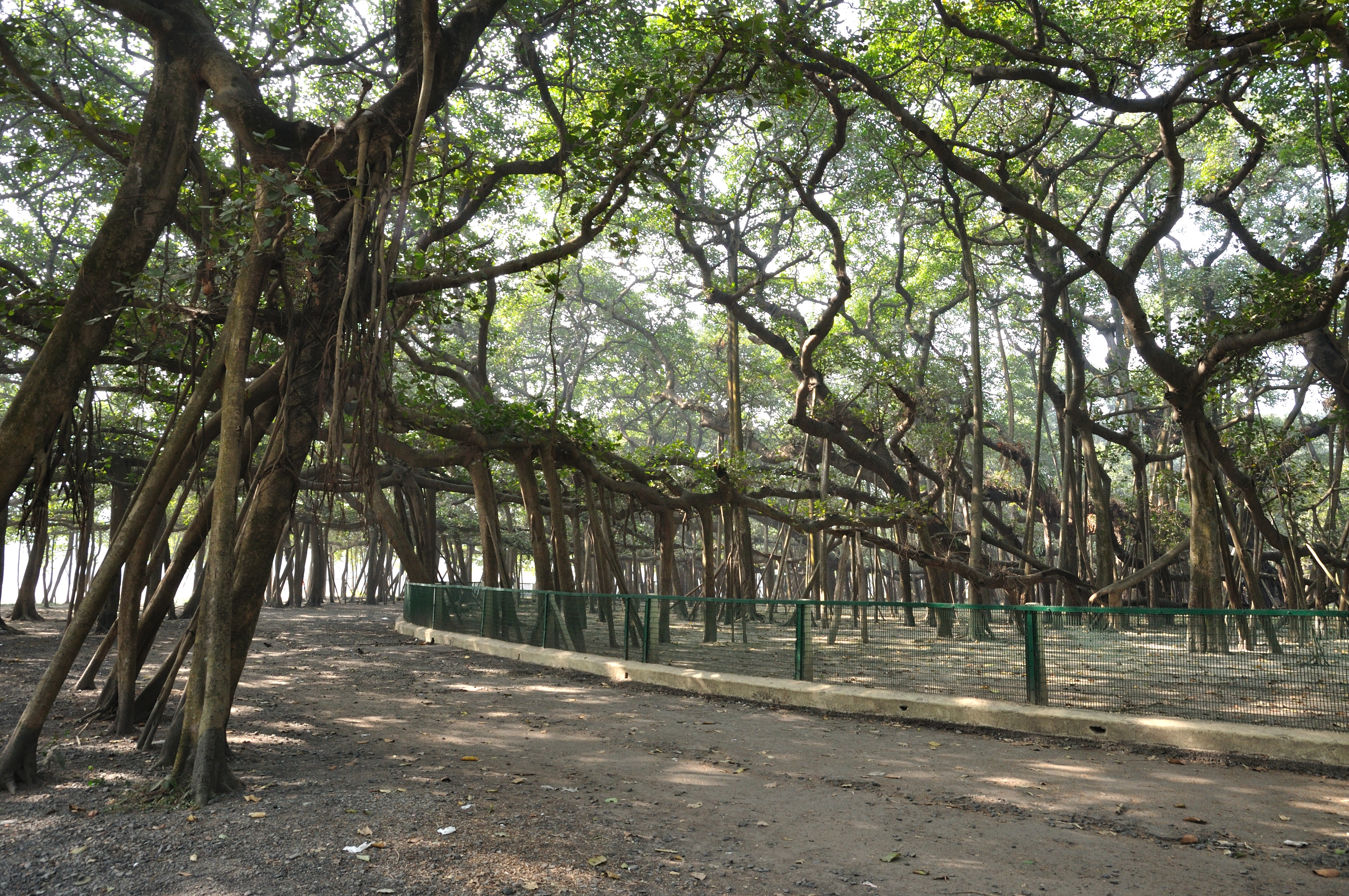

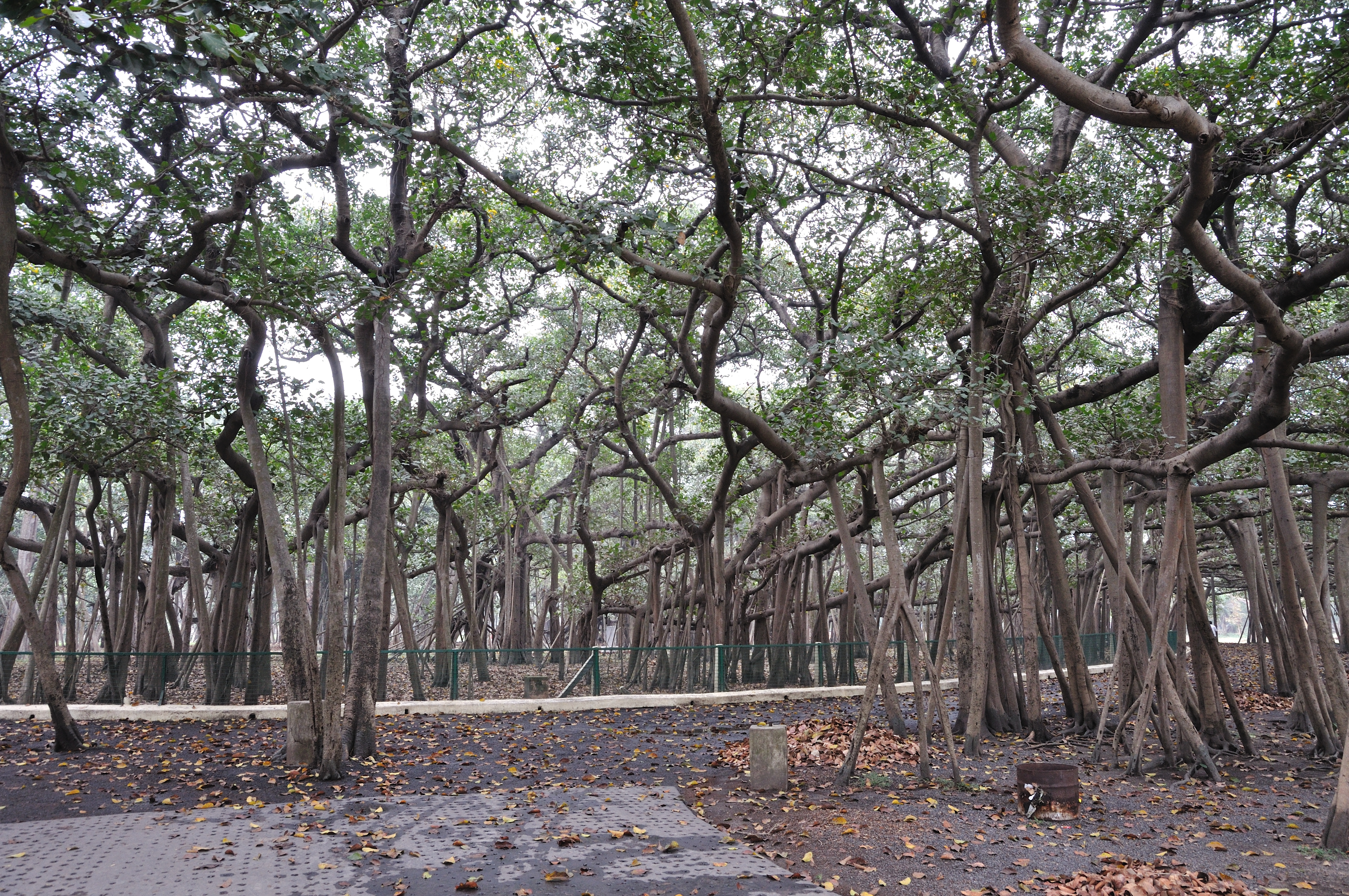

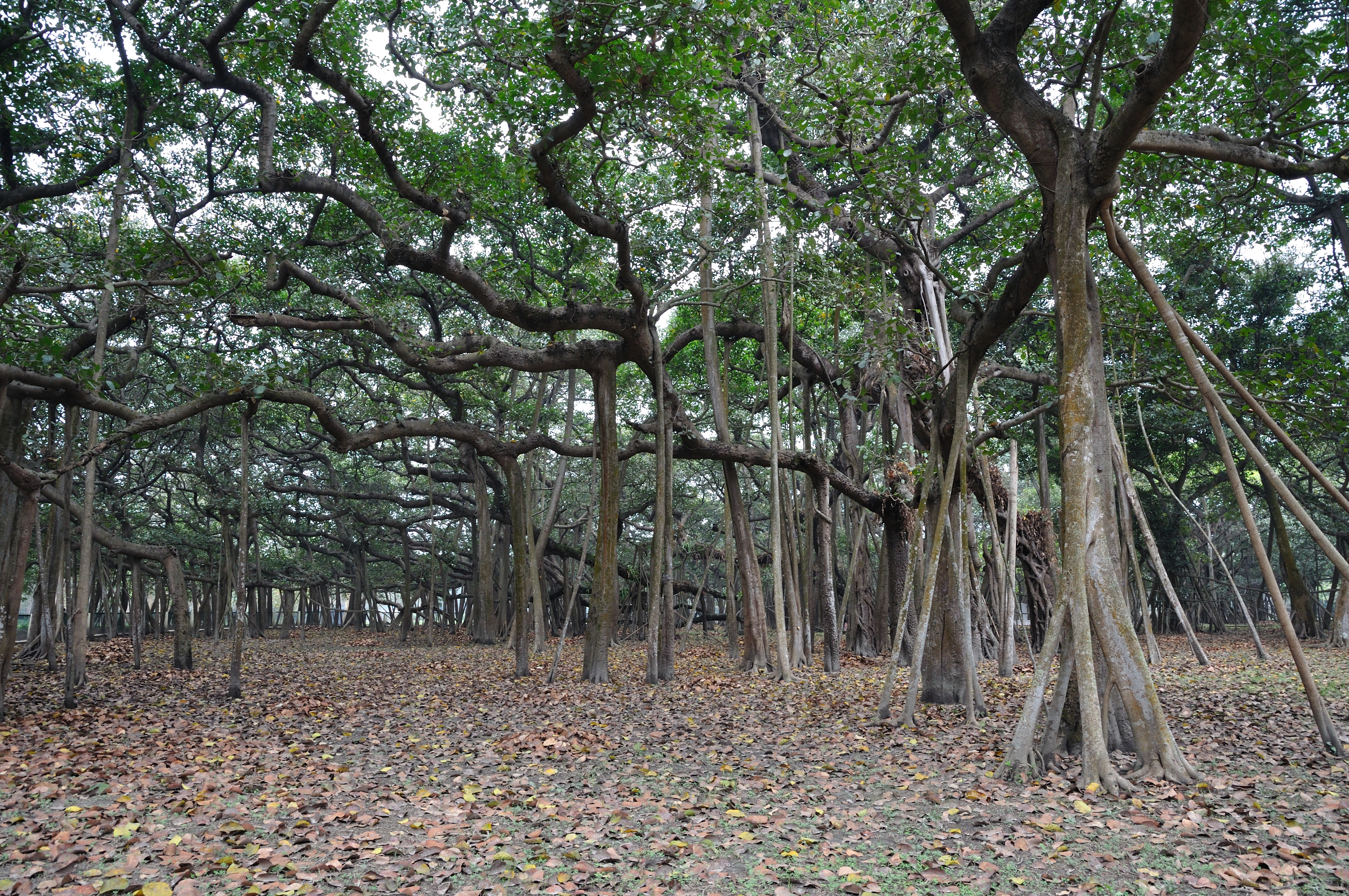

== See also ==
- Thimmamma Marrimanu (The World's Largest Banyan Tree)
- Bodhi tree at Bodh Gaya, the location of Buddha's enlightenment
- Jaya Sri Maha Bodhi, a sapling/cutting of original Bodhi tree planted in Sri Lanka in 288 BC
- Narora Siddhi Bari banyan tree, least 450 years old in Bulandshahr district of Uttar Pradesh in India
- List of Banyan trees in India
- List of individual trees
- Midh Ranjha Tree
- Dodda Alada Mara
