= Tree hugger =

Tree hugger may refer to:

- A term used for the Bishnois who perished in the Khejarli massacre while protecting trees
- A slang term, sometimes derogatory, for environmentalists
- Chipko movement, an environmental movement in India
- TreeHugger, a sustainability website
- The Tree Hugger Project, an environmental art project
- "Tree Hugger" (Camp Lazlo), a television episode
- "Tree Hugger" (Yes, Dear), a television episode
