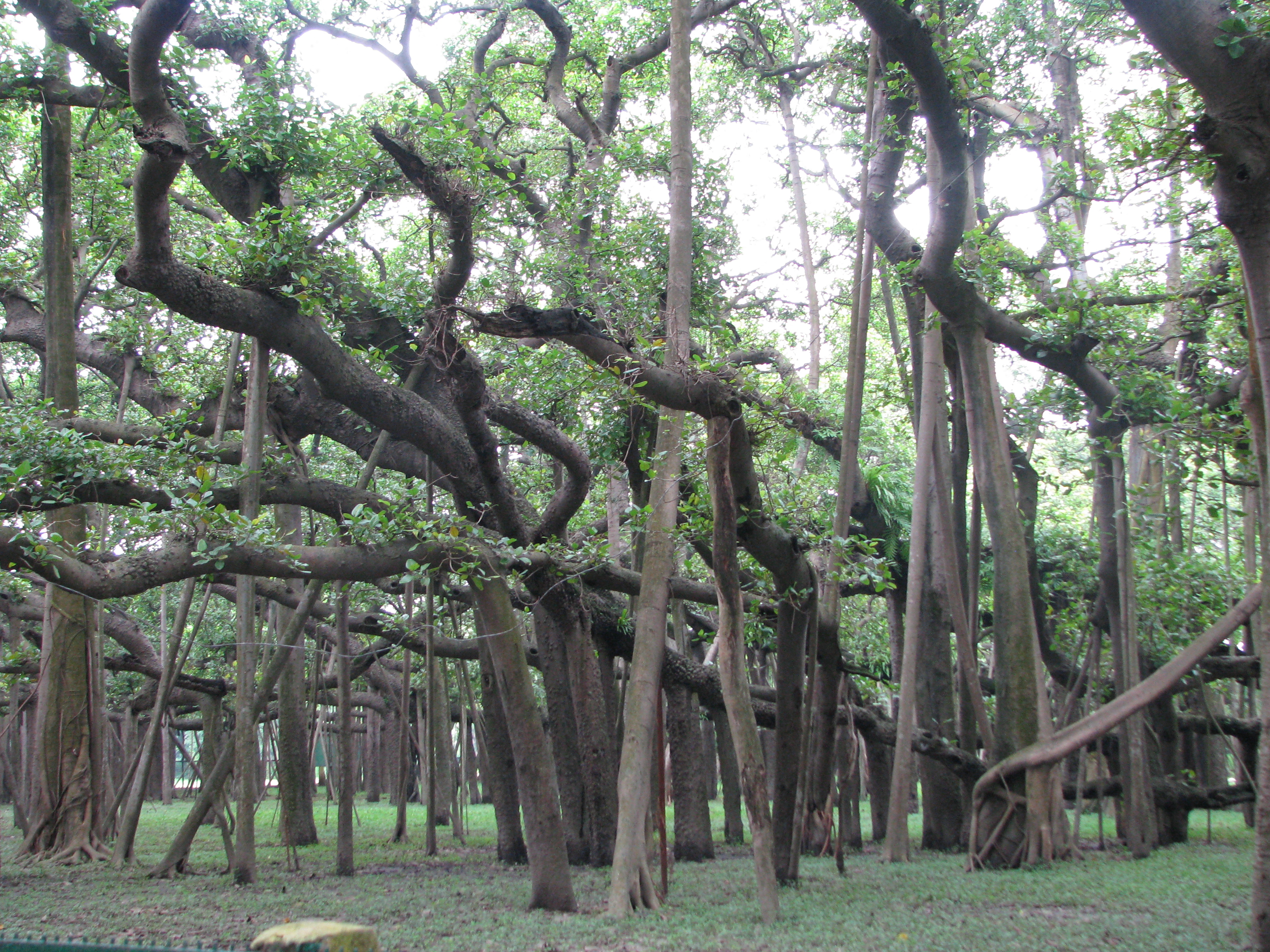
- The Great Banyan in Howrah, Kolkata
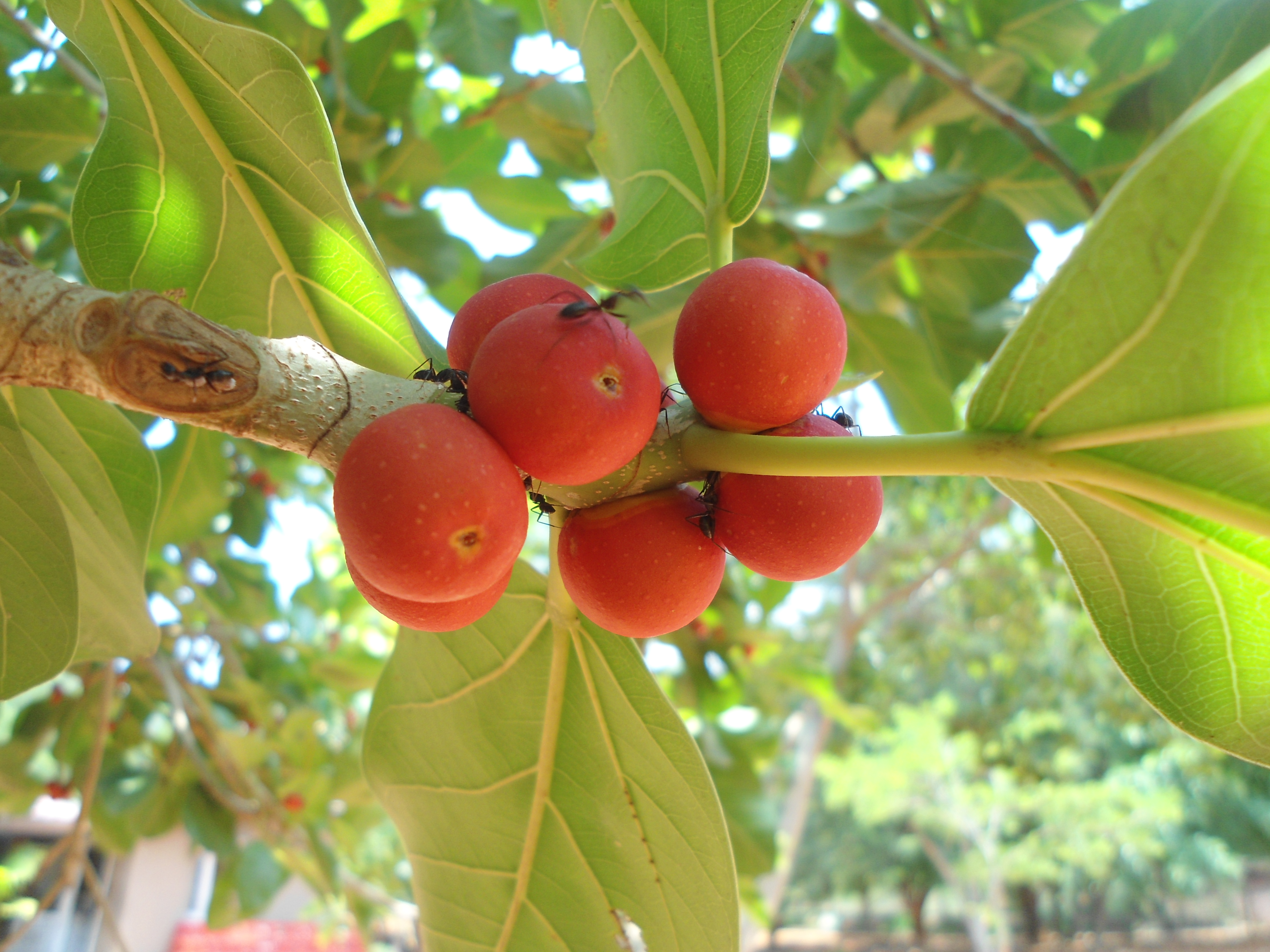
- Banyan figs at Indira Gandhi Zoo Park, Visakhapatnam

Conservation status
- Least Concern (IUCN 3.1)

Scientific classification
- Kingdom: Plantae
- Clade: Tracheophytes
- Clade: Angiosperms
- Clade: Eudicots
- Clade: Rosids
- Order: Rosales
- Family: Moraceae
- Genus: Ficus
- Subgenus: F. subg. Urostigma
- Species: F. benghalensis

Binomial name
- Ficus benghalensis L. (1753)

Synonyms
- Ficus banyana Oken; Ficus benghalensis var. benghalensis; Ficus benghalensis var. krishnae (C. D. C.) Corner; Ficus chauvieri G. Nicholson; Ficus cotoneifolia Vahl; Ficus cotonifolia Stokes; Ficus crassinervia Kunth & C. D. Bouché; Ficus indica L.; Ficus karet Baill.; Ficus lancifolia Moench; Ficus lasiophylla Link; Ficus procera Salisb.; Ficus pubescens B. Heyne ex Roth; Ficus umbrosa Salisb.; Perula benghalensis Raf.; Urostigma benghalense (L.) Gasp.

= Ficus benghalensis =

Banyan

Species of fig tree

Ficus benghalensis, Ficus indica, or Ficus audrey commonly known as banyan, banyan fig, audrey fig and Indian banyan, is a tree native to the Indian subcontinent. The countries where it originated include Sri Lanka, Nepal, Pakistan, India, and East Himalaya. Specimens in India are among the largest trees in the world by canopy coverage. It is also known as a "strangler fig" because like many other trees in the genus Ficus it starts out as epiphyte, that is, leaning on another tree that it ends up enveloping.

== Description ==
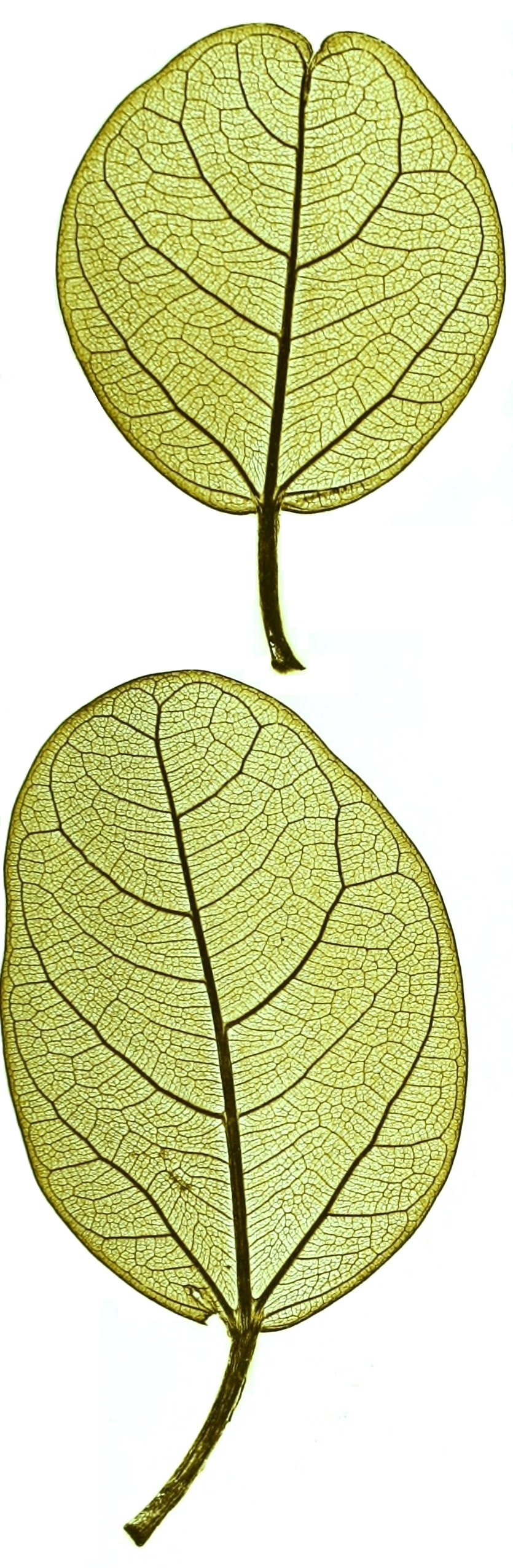
Nature printed leaves, showing shape and venation

Ficus benghalensis is an evergreen, monoecious, fast-growing tree found mainly in monsoon and rainforests, that can reach a height of up to 30 meters. It is resistant to drought and mild frost. It produces propagating aerial roots that grow downward. Once these roots reach the ground, they take root and become supportive woody trunks.

The figs produced by the tree are eaten by birds such as the Indian myna. Fig seeds that have passed through the digestive system of birds are more likely to germinate than those that have not.

== Reproduction ==
Banyan trees reproduce easily by seed or by stake, and they often spread from the original place by means of aerial roots that anchor in the ground and begin to grow and thicken to the point that they "become independent" from the original trunk, thus managing to "emigrate" sometimes at great distances. The figs are eaten by all kinds of frugivorous birds such as the coppersmith barbet and the common myna. Seeds that have passed through the digestive system of birds are more likely to germinate and grow faster.

Banyan seeds can fall and grow near a tree, sometimes from the very tree from which they come, and they also usually germinate in a hollow in a trunk or in a wall or rock. Gradually they begin to grow as they have plenty of support as epiphytes on any object they can use to climb in search of sunlight. Under normal conditions, the tree grows until it reaches a level where it gets the most sunlight, so its height can vary considerably. For this reason, where this tree predominates in a place, rather than growing in height, they spread on the surface, looking for the gaps that are left without vegetation. In general, the crown of this tree extends over a diameter well above its height.

== Distribution ==
In spite of being native solely to the Indian subcontinent, the tree has been cultivated in a variety of locations worldwide. For example, in East Asia it has been planted in Vietnam, Mayanmar and Laos, Queensland in Australia, Jamaica, and Trinidad-Tobago in the Caribbean, as well as Florida, USA. It has also flourished in Hawaii, but has not propagated beyond original cultivation due to the lack of the specific wasp required for its pollination. Since the inclusion of the wasp in Florida has caused invasiveness, there is a consensus that this wasp should not be brought to Hawaii.

Middle East: the tree is valued for both fruit and landscaping in three different cities in the UAE: Abu-Dhabi, Dubai, and Fujairah. Since the tree flourishes in full sun, the UAE has ideal climate for the tree to thrive. In Ismailah, Egypt, near the Suez Canal, it is part of a calculated ecological project for landscape fabrication. Prior to this, other species of ficus were already entrenched in parks, streets, gardens, and alongside canals. Their fruits are valued in Egyptian culture and are also used in traditional medicine for both skin and respiratory issues. The tree also flourishes in Tel Aviv, Israel, and its environs. One individual, which was planted in 1888 in Holon, has reached the size of a small building. Transplants taken from this particular specimen have been propagated in many other locations in Israel.

== Cultural significance ==
Ficus benghalensis is the national tree of India.

The tree is considered sacred in India, and temples are often built nearby. Due to the large size of the tree's canopy, it provides useful shade in hot climates.

In Theravada Buddhism, this tree is said to have been used as the tree for achieved enlightenment, or Bodhi by the twenty fourth buddha called "Kassapa - කස්සප". The sacred plant is known as "Nuga - නුග" or "Maha nuga - මහ නුග" in Sri Lanka.

It is the tree under which Adhinath the first Jain Tirthankara attained Kewal Gyan or spiritual enlightenment.

== Notable specimens ==
The giant banyans of India are the largest trees in the world by area of canopy coverage. Notable individual trees include:

- Thimmamma Marrimanu
- Kabirvad
- The Great Banyan
- Midh Ranjha tree

The largest known tree in the world in terms of the two dimensional area covered by its canopy is Thimmamma Marrimanu in Andhra Pradesh, India, which covers 19,107 square metres (205,670 sq ft). Its perimeter, 846 metres (2,776 ft), is also the greatest of any known tree.

Nearchus, an admiral of Alexander the Great, described a large specimen on the banks of the Narmada River in contemporary Bharuch, Gujarat, India; he may have described the tree presently named "Kabirvad". The canopy of the tree that Nearchus described was said to be so extensive that it sheltered 7,000 men. James Forbes later described it in his Oriental Memoirs (1813–5) as almost 610 m (2,000 ft) in circumference and having more than 3,000 trunks. Currently its canopy has an area of 17,520 square metres (188,600 sq ft) and a perimeter of 641 metres (2,103 ft).

Other notable Indian specimens include The Great Banyan in the Jagadish Chandra Bose Botanic Garden in Shibpur, Howrah, which has a canopy area of 18,918 square metres (203,630 sq ft) and is about 250 years old, and Dodda Aladha Mara in Kettohalli, Karnataka, which has a canopy area of 12,000 square metres (130,000 sq ft) and is about 400 years old.

== Gallery ==
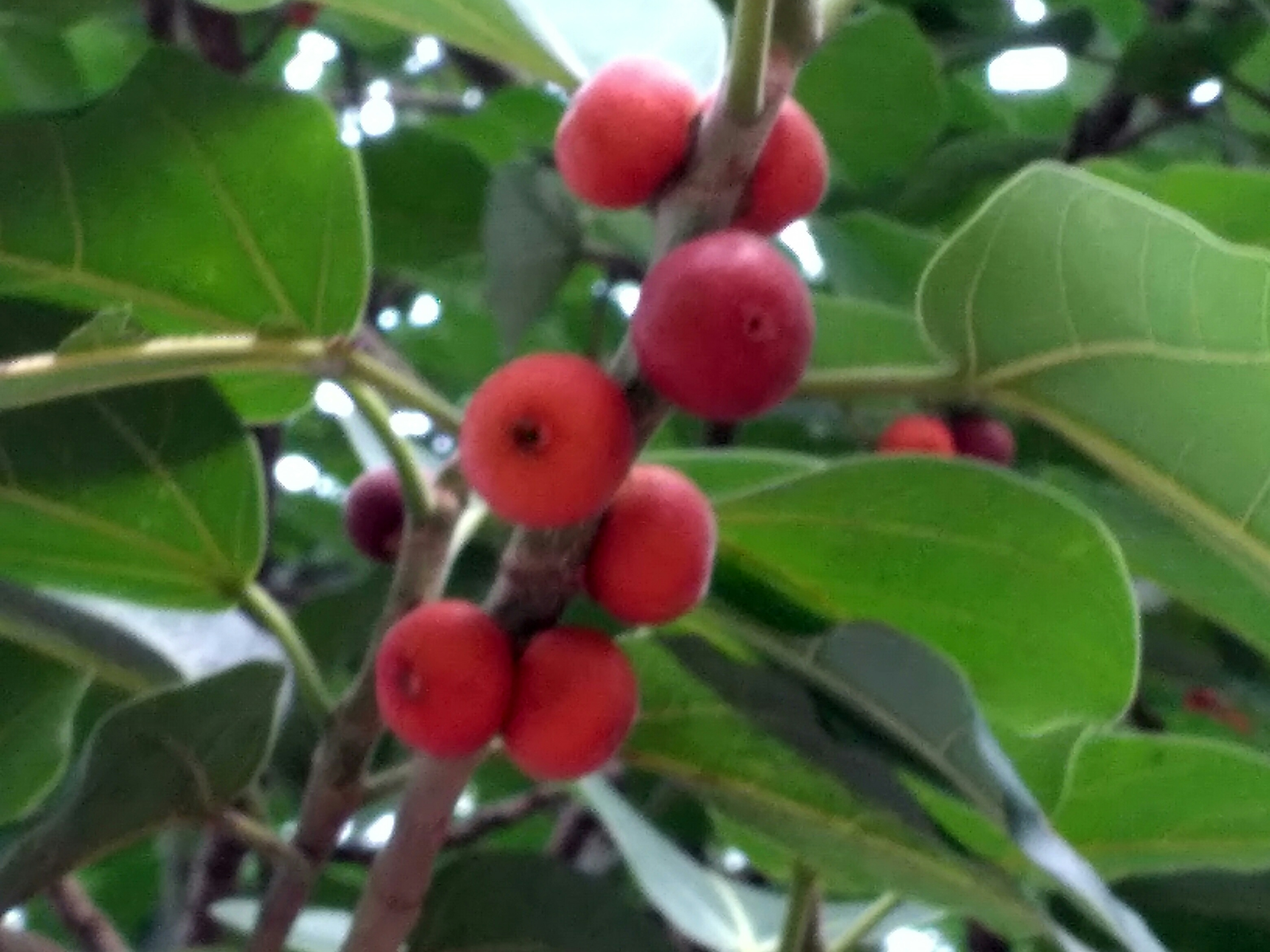
Ripe fruits of Indian banyan. Suhrawardy Udyan, Dhaka

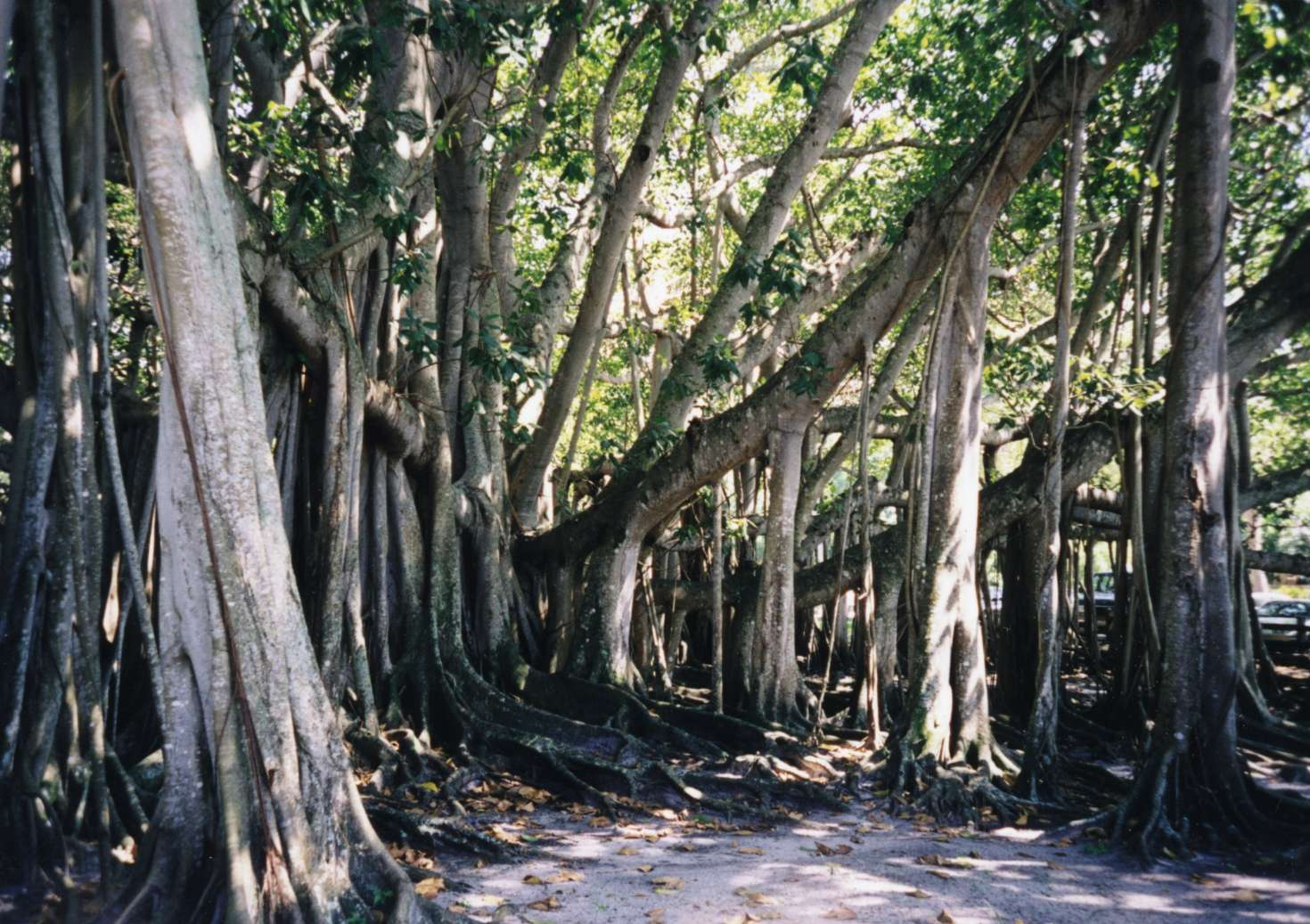
In front of the Edison museum in Fort Myers, Florida, US

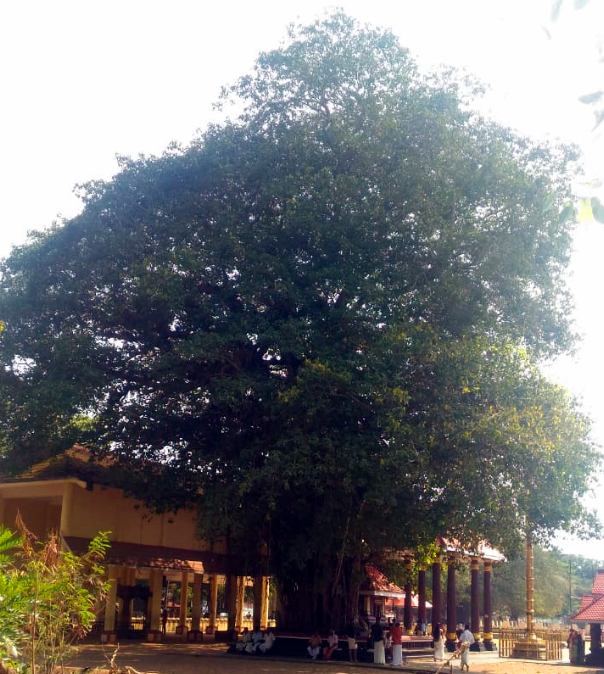
Ficus tree in front of Sarkaradevi Temple, Chirayinkeezhu, Thiruvananthapuram, Kerala
