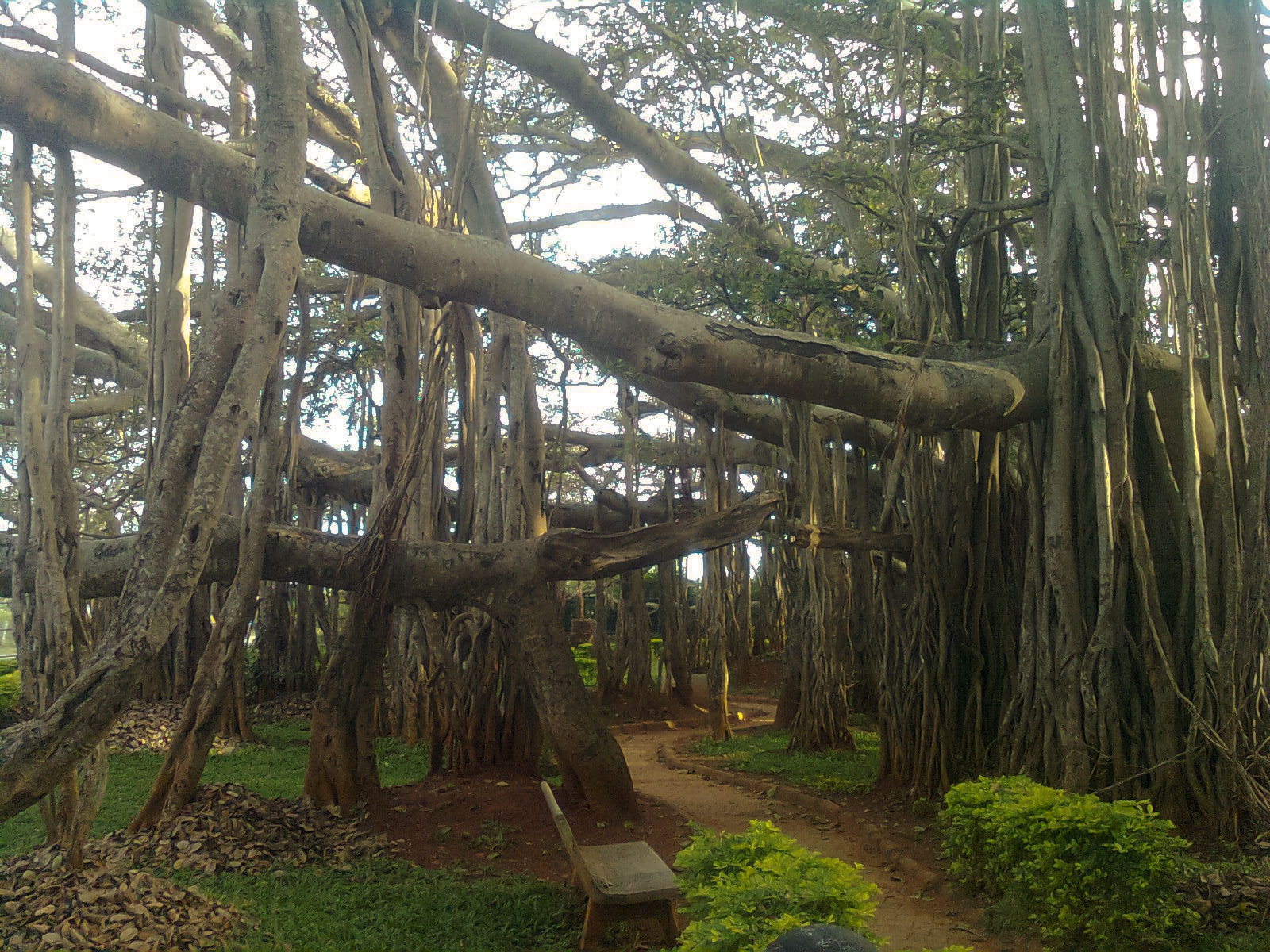
- Banyan with characteristic adventitious prop roots

Scientific classification
- Kingdom: Plantae
- Clade: Tracheophytes
- Clade: Angiosperms
- Clade: Eudicots
- Clade: Rosids
- Order: Rosales
- Family: Moraceae
- Genus: Ficus
- Subgenus: F. subg. Urostigma

Species
- See Ficus § Subgenus Urostigma.

= Banyan =

Subgenus of fig trees

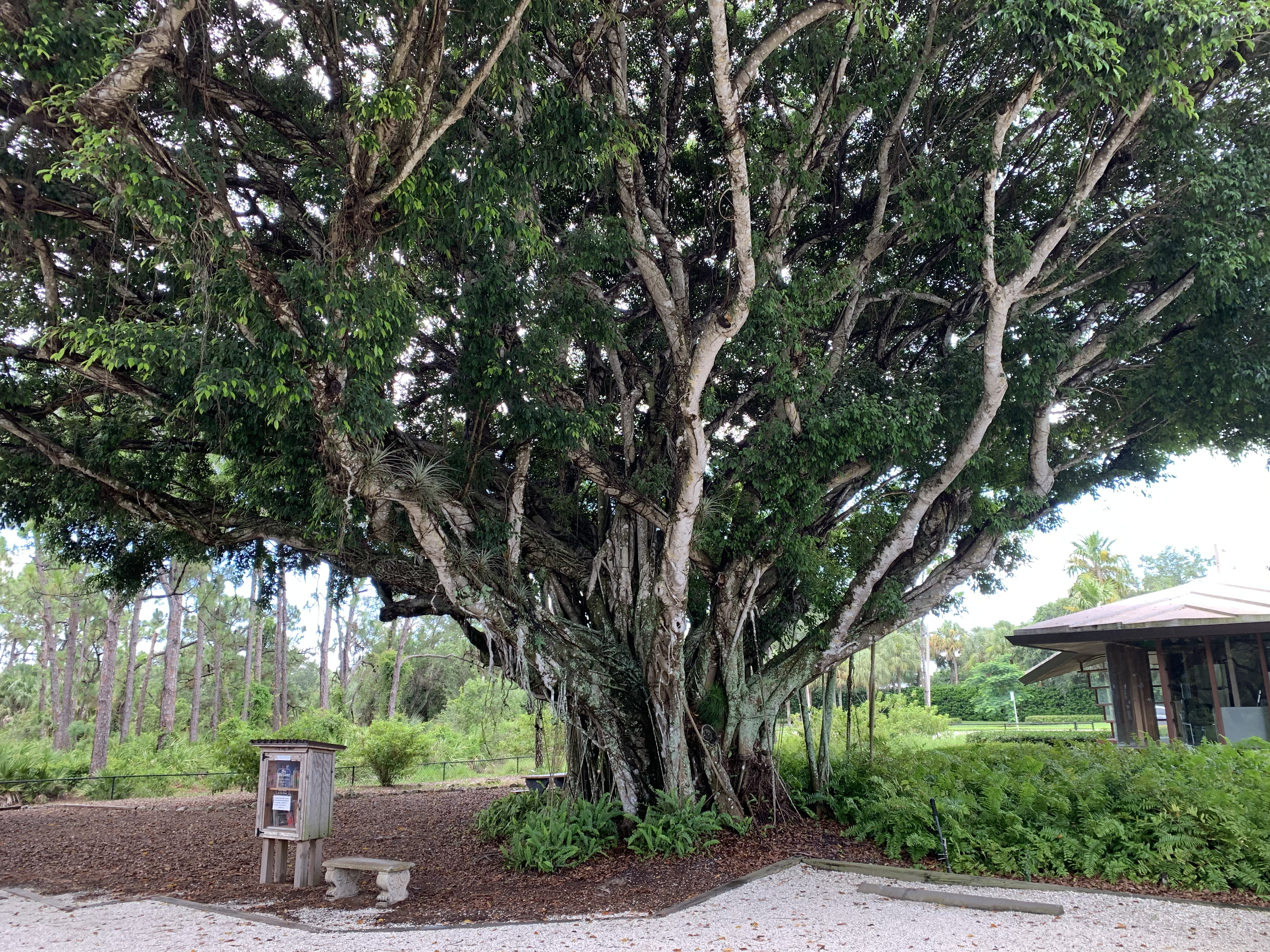
A banyan tree at the Naples, Florida Preserve

A banyan, also spelled banian (/ˈbænjən/ BAN-yən), is a fig that develops accessory trunks from adjacent prop roots, allowing the tree to spread outwards indefinitely. This distinguishes banyans from other trees with a strangler habit that begin life as an epiphyte, i.e. a plant that grows on another plant, when its seed germinates in a crack or crevice of a host tree or edifice. Banyan often specifically denotes Ficus benghalensis (the "Indian banyan"), which is the national tree of India, though the name has also been generalized to denominate all figs that share a common life cycle and used systematically in taxonomy to denominate the subgenus Urostigma.

== Characteristics ==
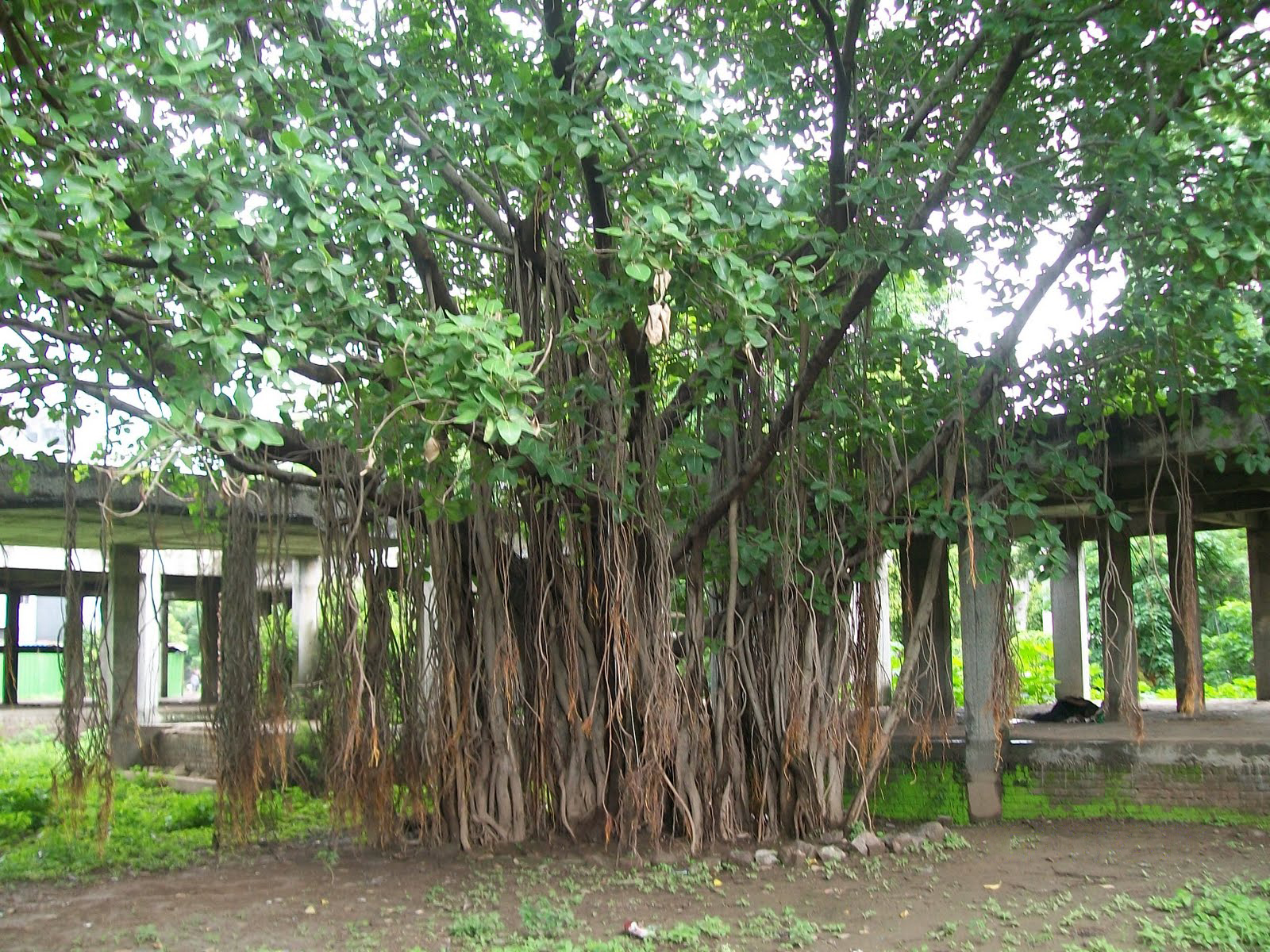
Banyan tree

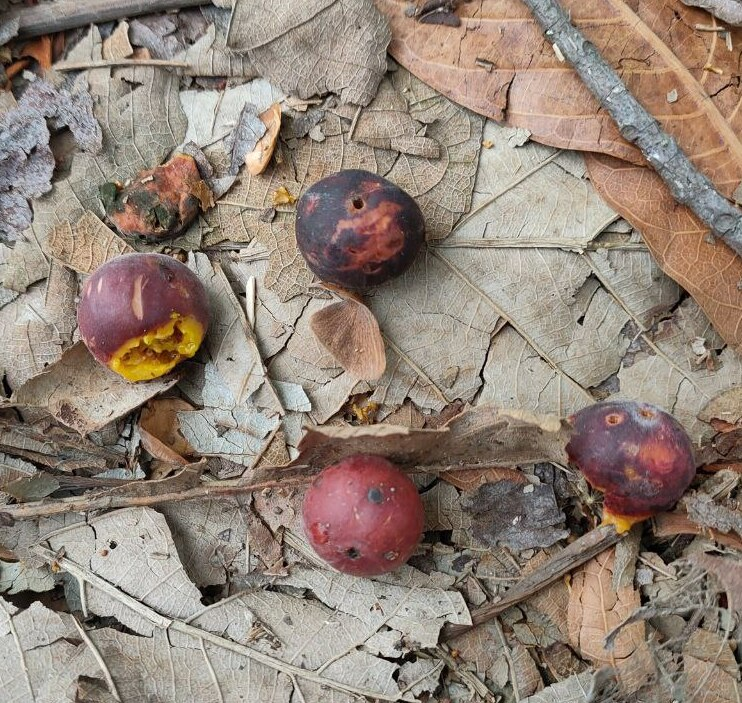
Ripe banyan fruits

Like other fig species, banyans also bear their fruit in the form of a structure called a "syconium". The syconium of Ficus species supply shelter and food for fig wasps and the trees depend on the fig wasps for pollination.

Frugivore birds disperse the seeds of banyans. The seeds are small, and because most banyans grow in woodlands, a seedling that germinates on the ground is unlikely to survive. However, many seeds fall on the branches and stems of other trees or on human edifices, and when they germinate they grow roots down toward the ground and consequently may envelop part of the host tree or edifice. This is colloquially known as a "strangler" habit, which banyans share with a number of other tropical Ficus species, as well as some other unrelated genera such as Clusia and Metrosideros.

The leaves of the banyan tree are large, leathery, glossy, green, and elliptical. Like most figs, the leaf bud is covered by two large scales. As the leaf develops the scales abscise. Young leaves have an attractive reddish tinge.

Older banyan trees are characterized by aerial prop roots that mature into thick, woody trunks, which can become indistinguishable from the primary trunk with age. These aerial roots can become very numerous. The Great Banyan of Kolkata, which has been tracked carefully for many years, currently has 2,880 supplementary trunks. Such prop roots can be sixty feet (eighteen meters) in height. Old trees can spread laterally by using these prop roots to grow over a wide area. In some species, the prop roots develop over a considerable area that resembles a grove of trees, with every trunk connected directly or indirectly to the primary trunk. The topology of this massive root system inspired the name of the hierarchical computer network operating system "Banyan VINES".

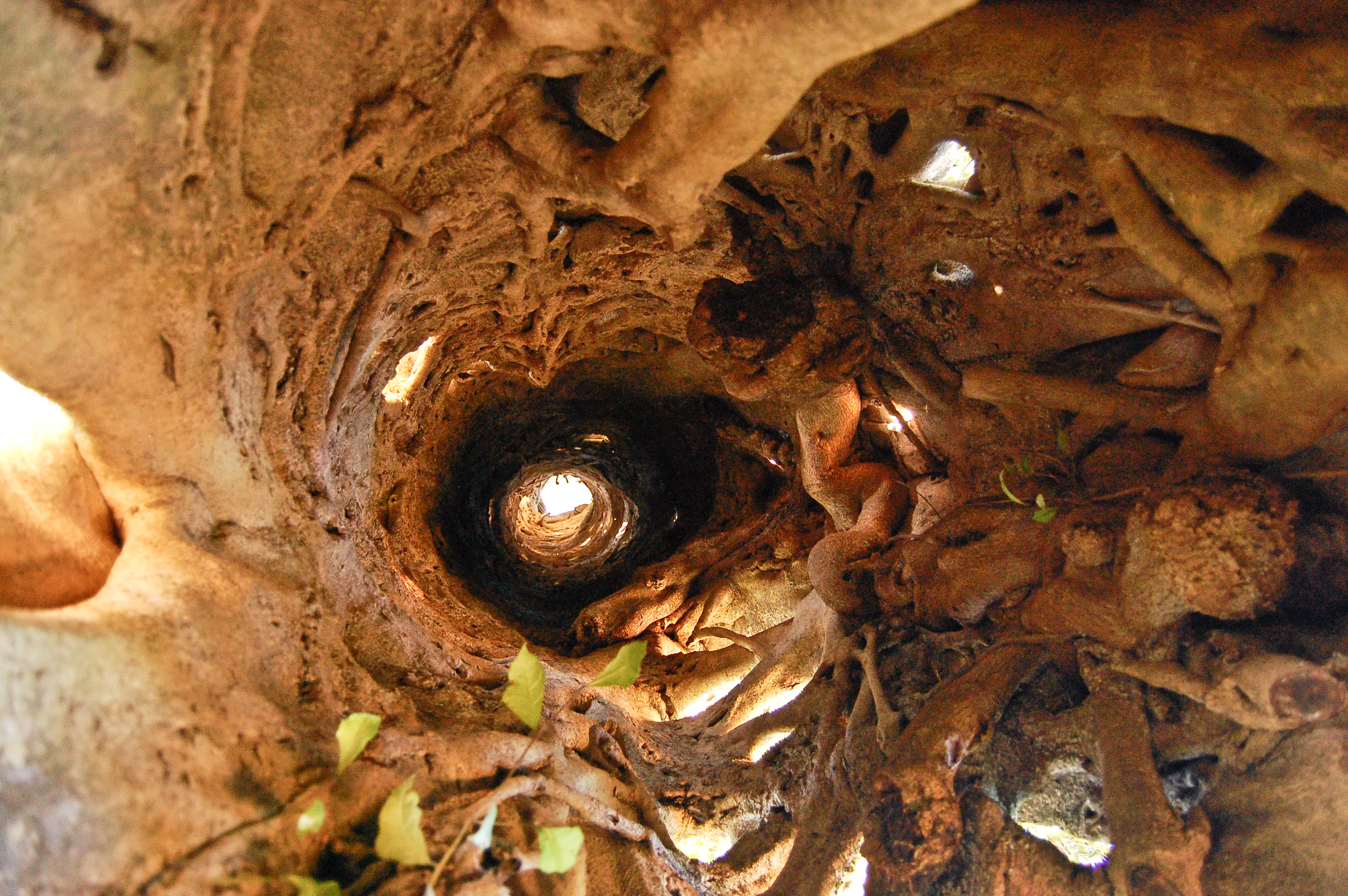
Looking upward inside a strangler fig where the host tree has rotted away, leaving a hollow, columnar fig tree

In a banyan that envelops its host tree, the mesh of roots growing around the latter eventually applies considerable pressure to and commonly kills it. Such an enveloped, dead tree eventually decomposes, so that the banyan becomes a "columnar tree" with a hollow, central core. In jungles, such hollows are very desirable shelters to many animals.

From research, it is known that the longevity of banyan tree is due to multiple signs of adaptive (MSA) evolution of genes.

== Etymology ==
The name was originally given to F. benghalensis and comes from India, where early European travelers observed that the shade of the tree was frequented by Banyans (a corruption of Baniyas, a community of Indian traders). Since that time, it has been planted in botanical gardens outside of its native ecosystem, as far away as California.

== Notable species ==
- F. benghalensis or Indian banyon is the namesake of the genus. Over time, the name became generalized to all strangler figs of the Urostigma subgenus.
- Ficus microcarpa, which is native to India, Nepal, Pakistan, Bangladesh, Bhutan, Sri Lanka, China, Taiwan, Southeast Asia, New Guinea, Australia, Ryukyu Islands and New Caledonia, is a significant invasive species elsewhere.
- The Central American banyan (Ficus pertusa) is native to Central America and northern South America, from southern Mexico south to Paraguay.
- The shortleaf fig (Ficus citrifolia) is native to South Florida, the Caribbean islands, Central America, and South America south to Paraguay.
- The Florida strangler fig (Ficus aurea) is also native to South Florida and the Caribbean islands, and distinguished from the above by its coarser leaf venation.
- The Moreton Bay fig (Ficus macrophylla) and Port Jackson fig (Ficus rubiginosa) are other related species.

== In horticulture ==
Due to the complex structure of the roots and extensive branching, the banyan is used as a subject specimen in penjing and bonsai. The oldest living bonsai in Taiwan is a 240-year-old banyan tree housed in Tainan.

== In culture ==
=== Religion and mythology ===
Banyan trees figure prominently in several Asian and Pacific religions and myths, including the following:

- Vat Purnima is a Hindu festival related to the banyan tree. Vat Purnima is observed by married women in North India and in the Western Indian states of Maharashtra, Goa, Gujarat. During the three days of the month of Jyeshtha in the Hindu calendar (which falls in May–June in the Gregorian calendar) married women observe a fast and tie threads around a banyan tree and pray for the well-being of their husbands.
- In Buddhism's Pali canon, the banyan (Pali: nigrodha) is referenced numerous times. Typical metaphors allude to the banyan's epiphytic nature, likening the banyan's supplanting of a host tree as comparable to the way sensual desire (kāma) overcomes humans.
- In Guam, the Chamorro people believe in tales of taotaomona, duendes, and other spirits. Taotaomona are spirits of the ancient Chamorro that act as guardians to banyan trees.
- In Vietnamese mythology of the Mid-Autumn Festival, the dark markings on the Moon are a banyan, a magical tree originally planted by a man named Cuội on Earth. When his wife watered it with unclean water, the tree uprooted itself with the man hanging on it and flew to the Moon, where he eternally accompanied the Moon Lady and the Jade Rabbit.
- In the Philippines, they are usually referred to as balete trees, which are home to certain deities and spirits.
- In Okinawa, the tree is referred to as gajumaru, which, according to traditional folklore, is the home for the mythical Kijimuna.

=== Notable banyan trees ===
- Bodhi tree at Bodh Gaya, the location of Buddha's enlightenment
- Jaya Sri Maha Bodhi, a sapling/cutting of original Bodhi tree planted in Sri Lanka in 288 BC.
- Thimmamma Marrimanu, recognised as world's largest banyan tree with canopy covering 21,000 m^{2} (2.1 ha), more than 550 years old tree is located in Indian Botanical Gardens in Anantapur 35 kilometres (22 mi) from the Kadiri town in Andhra Pradesh state of India.
- ITC Munger Banyan Tree in Bihar, India's oldest banyan tree as certified by Birbal Sahni Institute of Palaeosciences (BSIP) in three year 2022-25 carbon dating research to have one of its outer trunk and aerial roots to be at least 700 years old, though the original tree and its roots might be much older.
- Narora Siddhi Bari banyan tree, is at least 450 years old in Bulandshahr district of Uttar Pradesh in India.
- One of the largest trees, the Great Banyan is found in Kolkata, India. Its canopy covers 4.67 acres (1.89 ha)
- Another such tree, Dodda Aalada Mara as in "Big Banyan Tree", is found in the village of Ramohalli, on the outskirts of Bangalore, India; it has a spread of circa 2.5 acres.
- The Iolani Palace banyans in Honolulu, Hawaii. In the 1880s Queen Kapiolani planted two banyan trees within the Iolani Palace grounds. These trees have since grown into large groupings of trees on the old historic palace grounds.
- Maui, Hawaii has the Banyan tree in Lahaina planted by William Owen Smith on 24 April 1873, in Lahaina's Courthouse Square to mark the 50th anniversary of the arrival of the first American Protestant mission. In 2023, it had grown to cover two-thirds of an acre, but the tree was damaged by the 2023 Hawaii wildfires from 8–9 August which also severely damaged the town of Lahaina, and roughly half its former canopy survived the fire.
- One large banyan tree, Kalpabata, is inside the premises of Jagannath Temple in Puri. It is considered sacred by the devotees and is supposed to be more than 500 years old.
- A large banyan tree lives in Cypress Gardens, at the Legoland theme park located in Winter Haven, Florida. It was planted in 1939 in a 5-gallon bucket.
- Adayar Banyan Tree, located in the Theosophical Society Campus in Adayar, Chennai, India, is around 450 years old.
- The banyan tree from Miary, Madagascar which is said to be 1,700 years old.

=== Other ===
- The banyan tree is depicted in the coat of arms of Indonesia as a manifestation of the third principle of Pancasila (the unity of all of Indonesia). It is also used in the emblem of Golkar.
- The Economist magazine features an opinion column covering topics pertaining to Asia named "Banyan".
- In southern Vanuatu, the clearings under banyan trees are used as traditional meeting places. The quarterly newsletter of the British Friends of Vanuatu Society is named Nabanga, after the local word for banyan.
- The Banyan Tree is a notoriously difficult room in the 1984 ZX Spectrum platform game Jet Set Willy.
- The Foggy Swamp in Avatar: The Last Airbender consists of a single banyan grove tree.
- The title track from Steely Dan's 1977 album Aja contains the lyric "Chinese music under banyan trees, here at the dude ranch, above the sea."
- On 13 December 2021, Chinese Communist Party (CCP) general secretary Xi Jinping personally intervened to punish and demote 10 CCP officials in Guangzhou after they cut down or uprooted thousands of banyan trees.
- During the age of sail, 'Banyan' was used as an expression for a party, especially one at the fo'c'sle. This is likely due to religious festivals in India being held under the tree, of which East Indiamen would have been familiar.
- The banyan inspired the science-fiction British author Brian Aldiss to create the world-sized Banyan Tree depicted in his novel Hothouse.

== Gallery ==
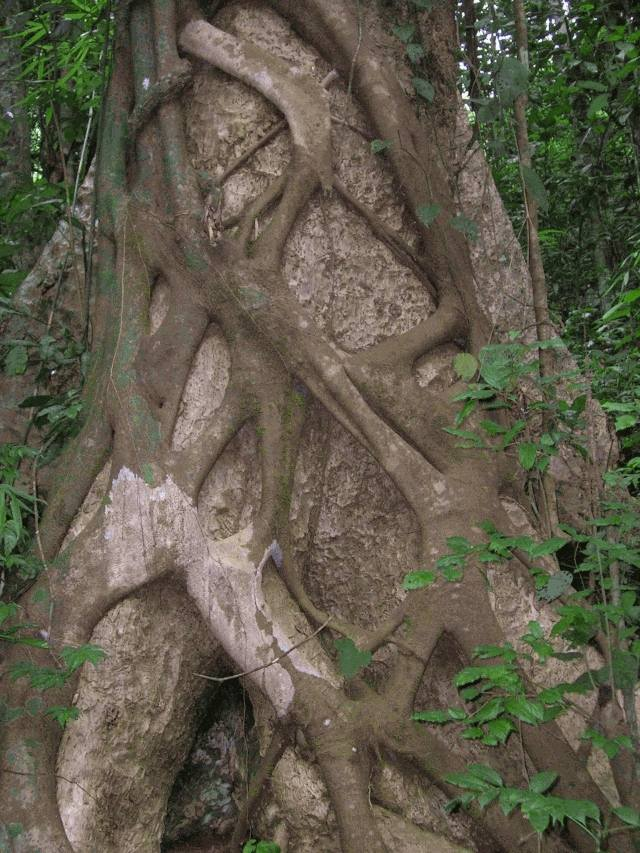
Early stages of a strangler fig on a host tree in the Western Ghats, India

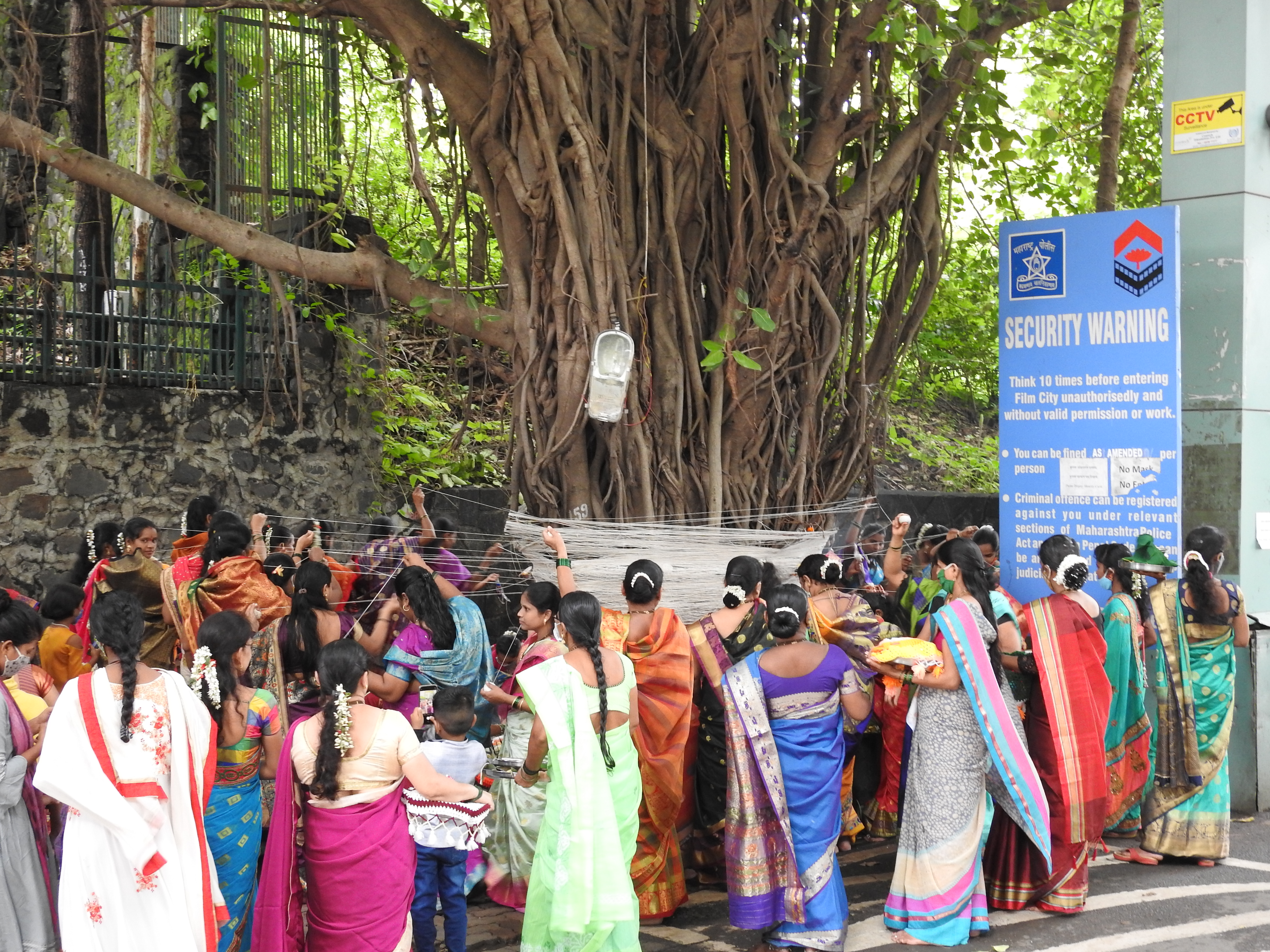
During Vat Purnima festival, married women tying threads around a banyan tree.

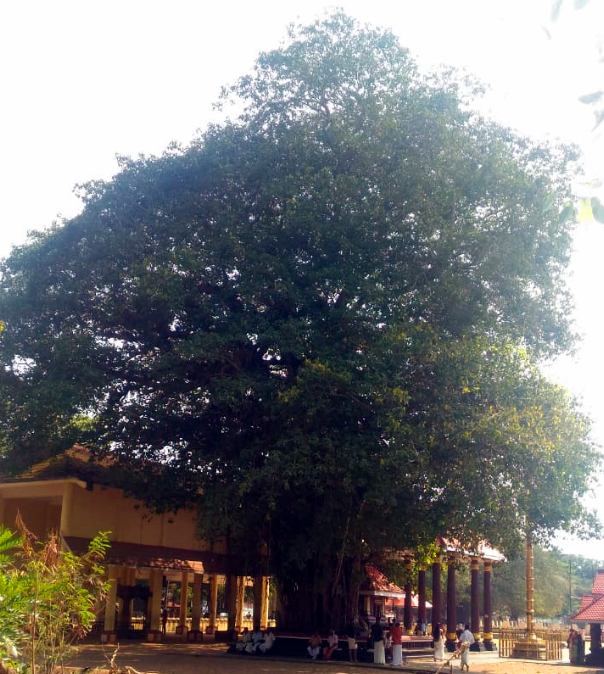
Ficus tree in front of Sarkaradevi Temple, Kerala, India.

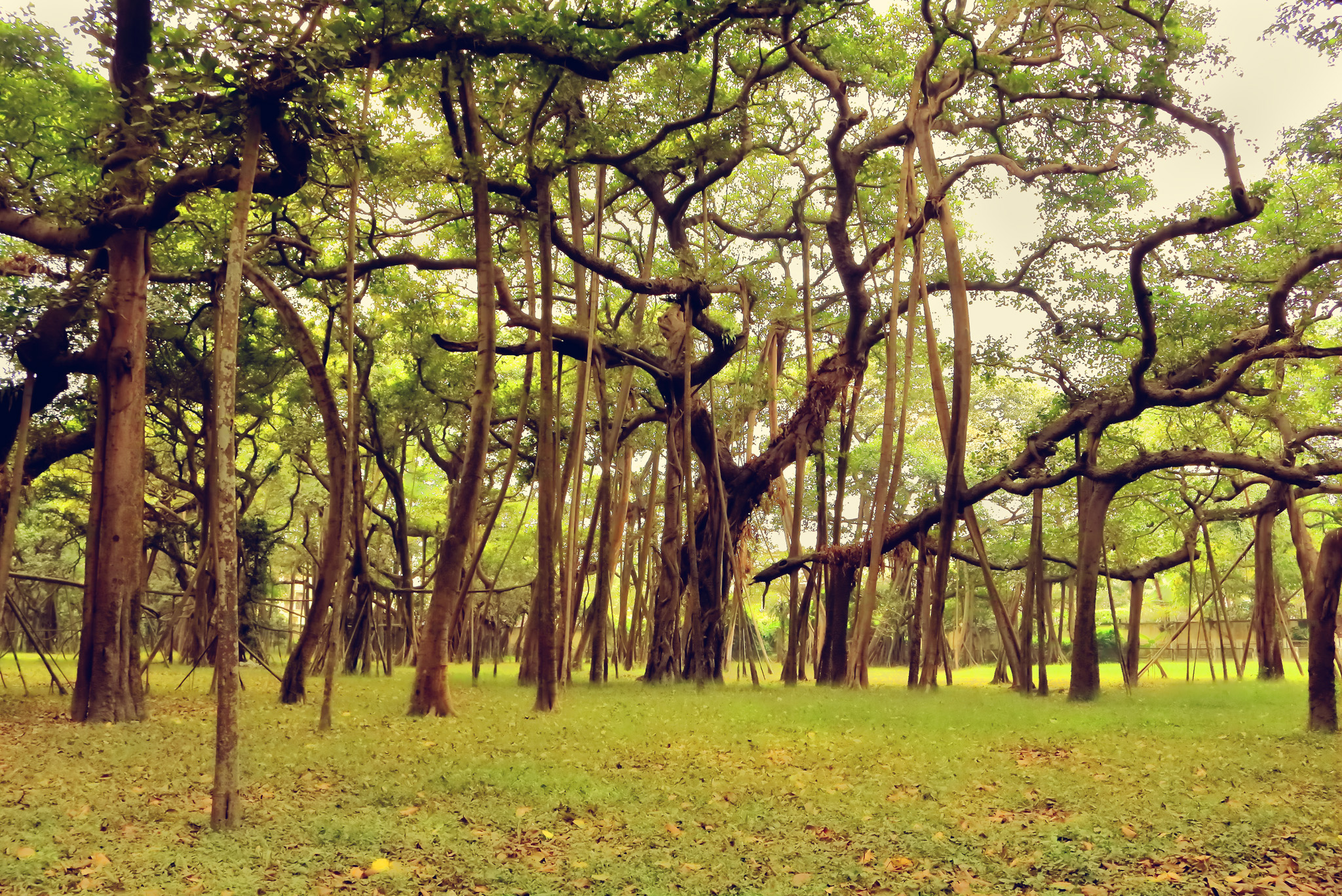
The Great Banyan in Kolkata, India.

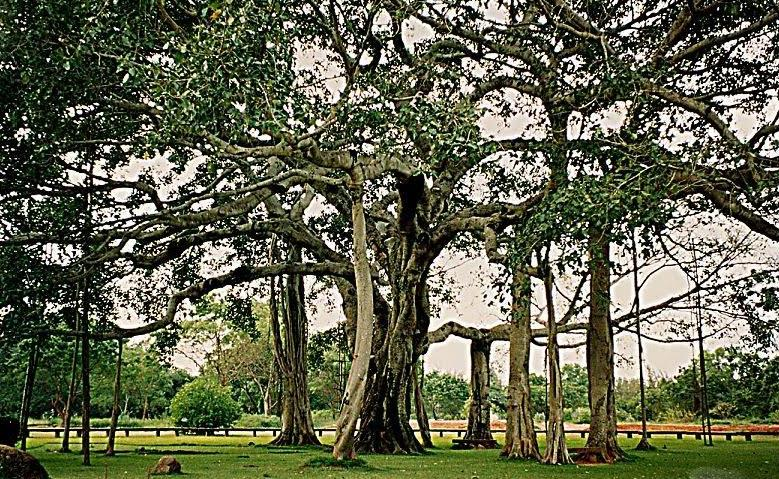
Thimmamma Marrimanu

The coat of arms of Indonesia depicts a banyan tree.

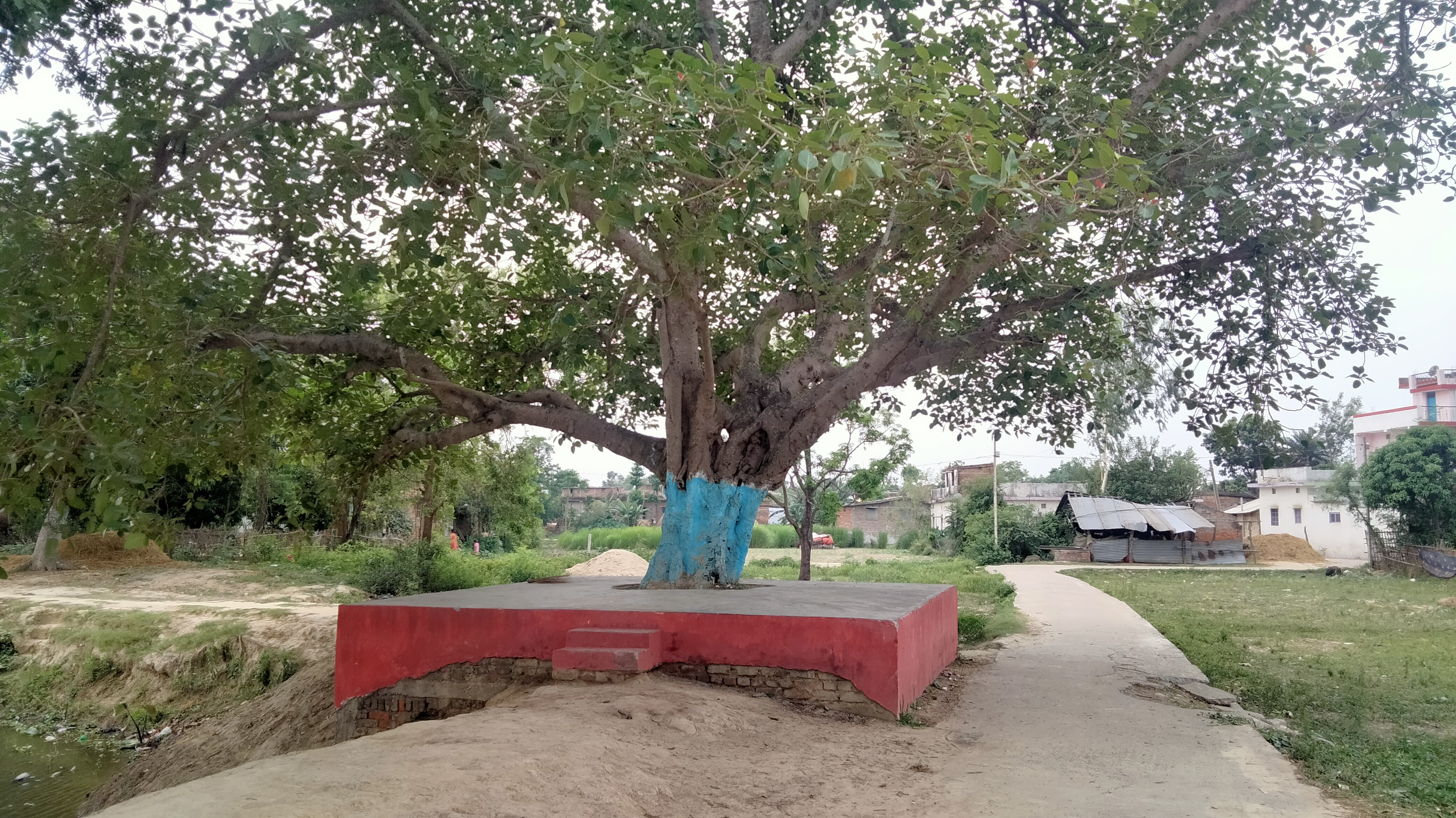
In Mithila region, Banyan tree is called Var Gachhi. The photo is taken at the bank of Chaudhary Pokhair in the campus of Basuki Nath Mahadev Mandir.

== See also ==
- Bodhi Tree
- Midh Ranjha tree
