= Kavu =

Sacred groves in Kerala, India

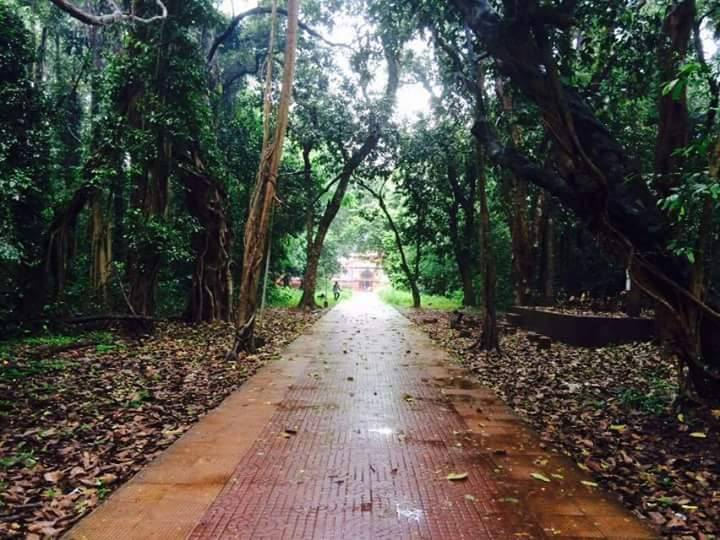
Mannan Purath Kavu, Nileshwaram

Kavu is the traditional name given for sacred groves across the Malabar Coast in Kerala, South India. Kavus are notable for Theyyam, the centuries-old ritual dance.

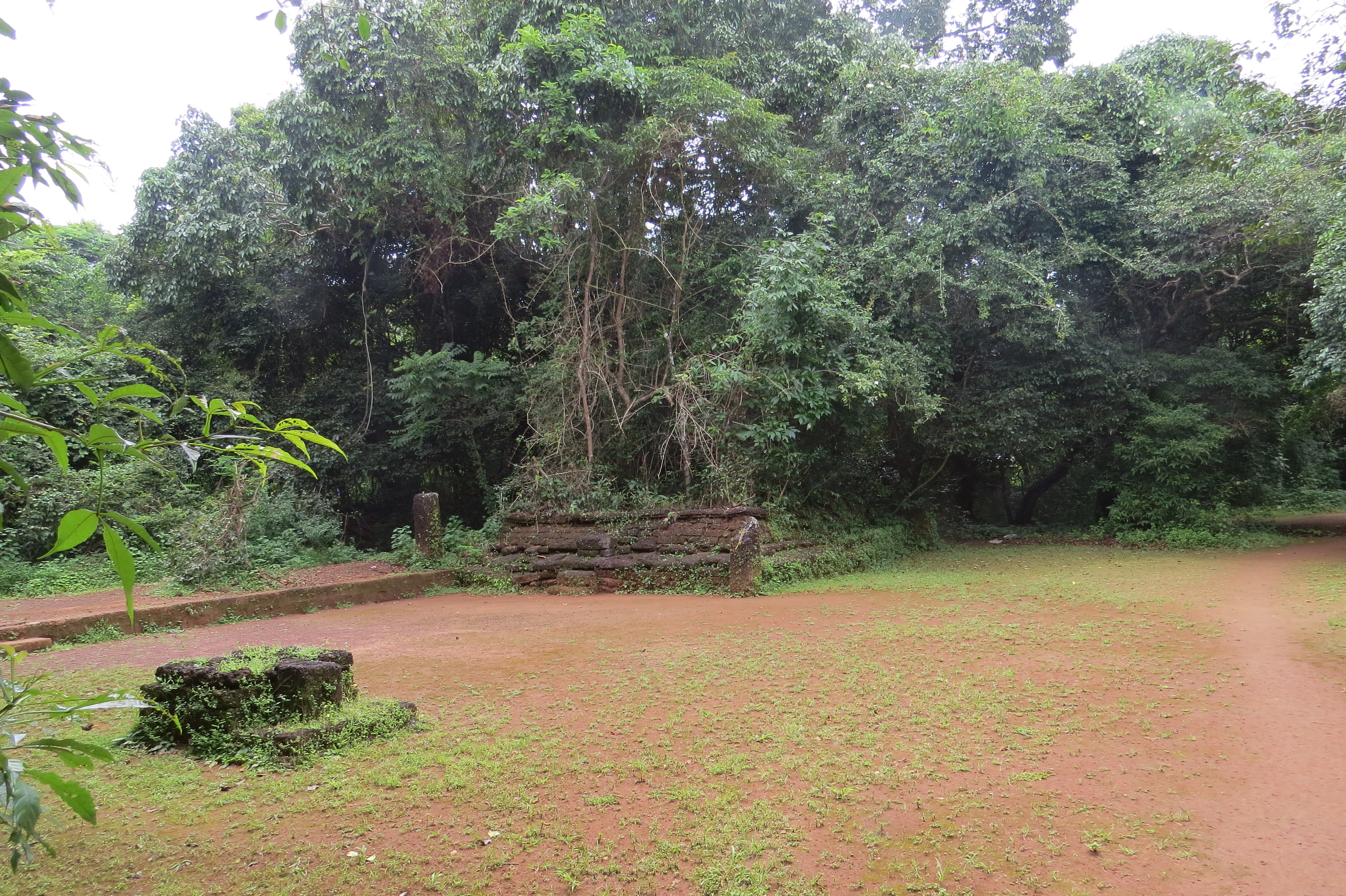
Neeliyar Kottam In Mangattuparamba‚ Kannur

== Snake Groves ==
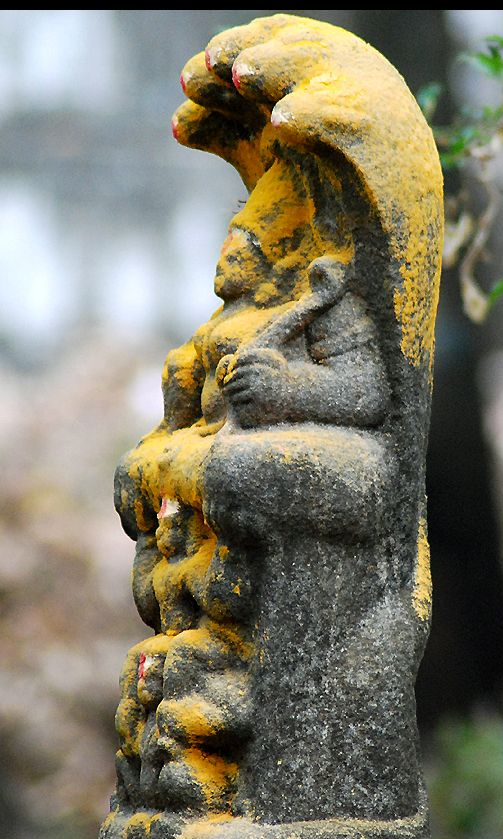
Sarpa Kavu at Sakthanthamburan palace, Thrissur

A Sarpa Kavu (meaning Abode of Snakes) is a traditional natural sacred space seen near traditional homes in Kerala state of South India. The site is believed to be inhabited by snakes, and the area usually contains a representation of Nagayakshis ('Goddess of the Snakes'), Naga Raja (King of the Snakes) and other Naga Devatas (snake deities), where offerings and rites are performed during special ceremonies. This is a Hindu ritual performed by certain sects of Nambudiris, and all castes hold the Sarpa Kavu in reverence, with access forbidden to the area unless for due ceremonies.

Brahmin mythology says that Kerala was created from the Arabian Sea and given to the Brahmins (Nambudiris) as a "donation" by Parasurama to save himself from the sins of killing numerous kshathriya kings. The land was full of forests and poisonous snakes were found in plenty. So the Brahmins refused to stay there. Parasurama requested Lord Shiva to provide a solution. Shiva told Parasurama to start worshipping Manasa, Anantha and Vasuki the king of snakes. Parasurama did so and they advised him to start snake worship in Kerala and provide some forest especially for snakes in the form of Sarppakkavu (Snake forests). Parasurama later installed the idols of Goddess Manasa, Anantha and Vasuki at Mannarassala (near Harippadu in Alappuzha district) and Vettikkottu (near Kayamkulam in Alappuzha district) and started worshipping them. The Brahmins also worshipped Goddess Manasa, Anantha and Vasuki and the pleased snake deities made Kerala suitable for living.

Sarpa Kavus even help in soil and water conservation besides preserving its rich biological wealth. The ponds and streams adjoining the groves are perennial water sources. These are the last resorts to many of the animals and birds for their water requirements, especially during summer. Sacred groves also enrich the soil through its rich litter composition. The nutrients generated thus are not only recycled within the sacred grove ecosystem but also find their way into the adjoining agroeco systems.

== Sacred Groves ==
A Kavu is a South Indian version of an Indian sacred grove.

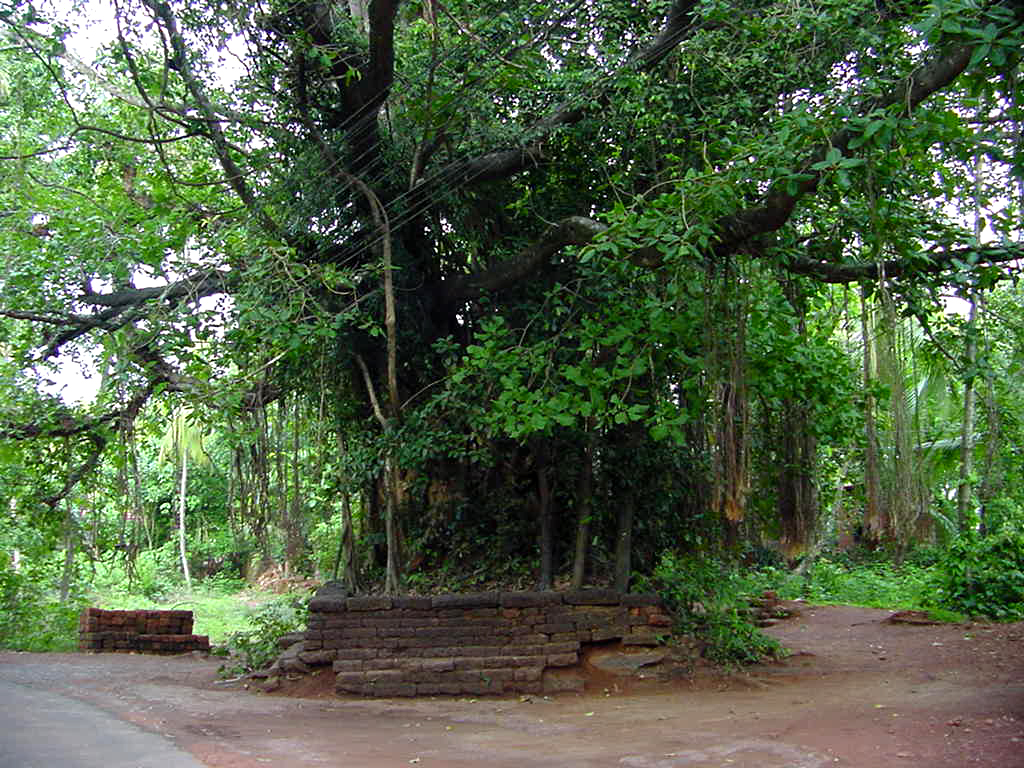
Banyan Tree at a temple in Kannur, Kerala

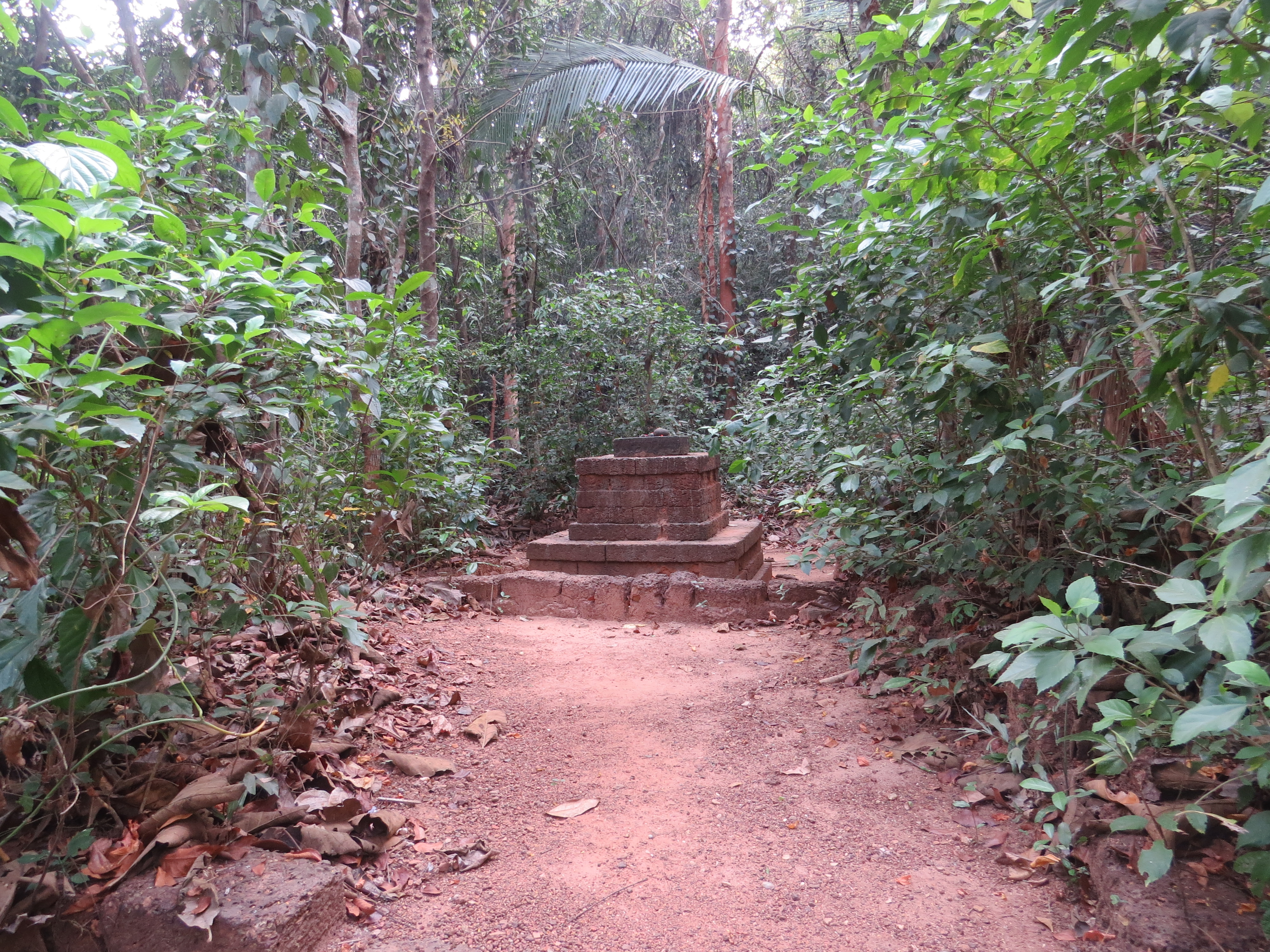
Sacred grove in Mayyil, Kerala

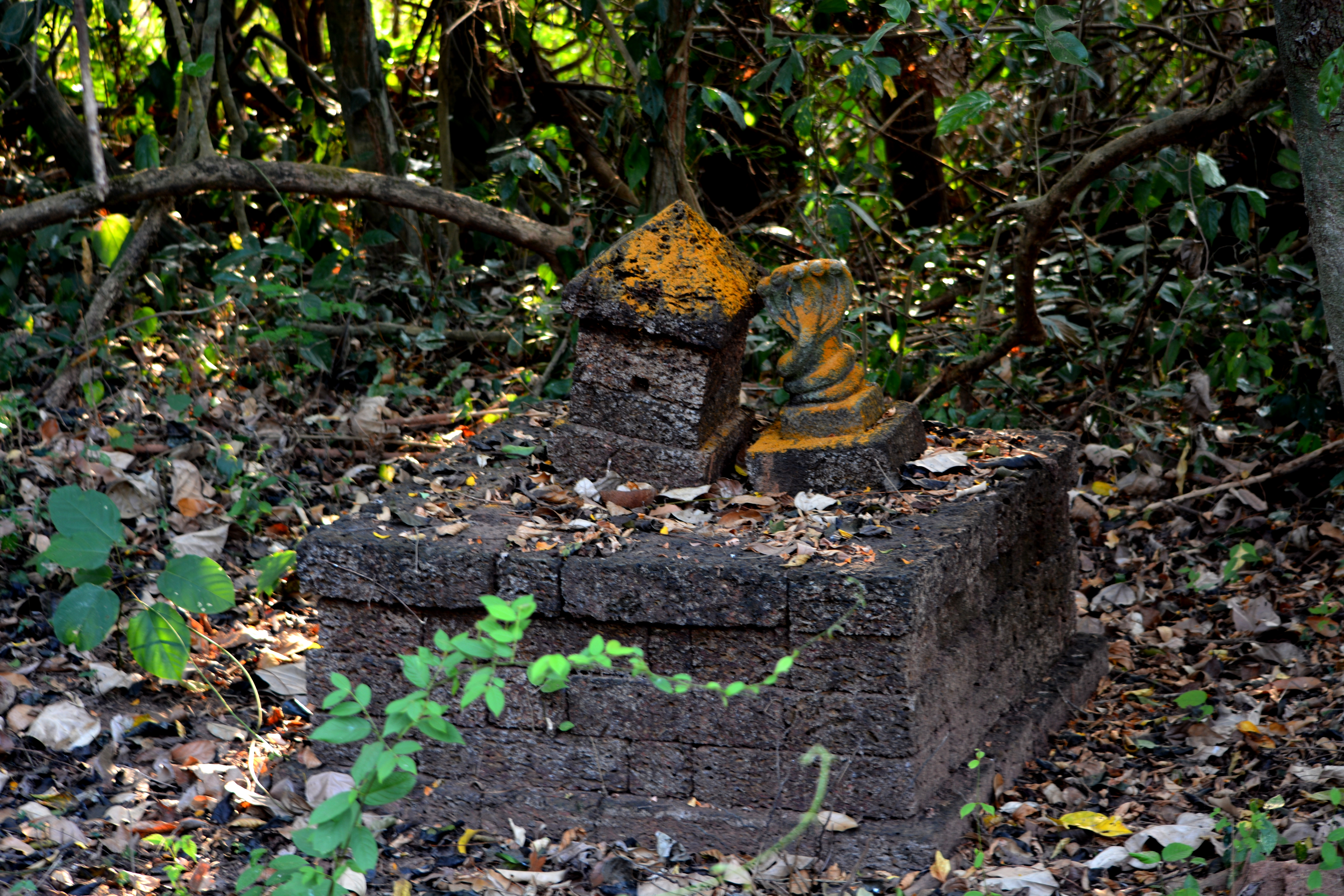
Sarpakkavu in Taliparamba, Kerala

Sacred groves of India are forest fragments of varying sizes, which are communally protected, and which usually have a significant religious connotation for the protecting community. Hunting and logging are usually strictly prohibited within these patches. Other forms of forest usage like honey collection and deadwood collection are sometimes allowed on a sustainable basis. Sacred groves did not enjoy protection via federal legislation in India. Some NGOs work with local villagers to protect such groves. Traditionally, and in some cases even today, members of the community take turns to protect the grove. However, the introduction of the protected area category community reserves under the Wild Life (Protection) Amendment Act, 2002 has introduced legislation for providing government protection to community held lands, which could include sacred groves.

Indian sacred groves are sometimes associated with temples / monasteries / shrines or with burial grounds (which is the case in Shinto and Ryukyuan religion-based sacred groves respectively in Japan). Sacred groves may be loosely used to refer to other natural habitat protected on religious grounds, such as Alpine Meadows.

Historical references to sacred groves can be obtained from ancient classics as far back as Kalidasa's Vikramuurvashiiya. There has been a growing interest in creating green patches such as Nakshatravana.

== Beliefs and practices ==
Typically, such groves are associated with the concept of a "presiding deity". While most of these sacred deities are associated with local Hindu gods, sacred groves of Islamic and Buddhist origins, and some based on smaller local religions and folk religions (like the folk deities ayyanar and amman ) are also known of. There are over 1000 deities associated with sacred groves in the states of Kerala and Karnataka alone. In Kodagu district in Karnataka from time immemorial the martial community of Kodavas had maintained over 1000 Deva kadus dedicated to Aiyappa the forest god.

The Hindu tradition considers forests (Van/ Ban) to be of three types - Tapovan, Mahavan and Sreevan. Tapovan are forests associated with penance (Tapas), and are inhabited by saints and rishis. Mahavan refers to the grand natural forests. Tapovan and Mahavan are considered to be a Raksha ("sanctuary") for flora and fauna as ordinary human beings are not allowed to enter these forests. Sreevan, which means, "forests of the goddess of prosperity", consists of dense forests and groves. From the former, people would collect dry wood, leaves, forest produce and a limited amount of timber, though natural ecosystem would not be unnecessarily disturbed. Groves were considered as spaces of forests from where harvesting could be done. Sometimes, specific trees like mango trees could be planted and nurtured here. Groves were associated with religious rites, festivals and recreation. Typical recreational activities associated with these groves included jhoola/ jhoolan. In the villages, Panchavati, or a cluster of five trees that represented the forests, were maintained. These trees represented the five elements of Earth, Water, Fire, Air and Space.

Planting and nurturing of trees has been a highly evolved practice in ancient India. Vrukshayurveda, the science of plant life and also a 10th-century treatise of that title on the subject ascribed to Surapala, dealt with various species of trees and their growth. Verses 9-23 from this text indicate how mystical beliefs and conservation of ecology was inter-connected.

A person is honored in Vaikuntha for as many thousand years as the days they reside in a house where tulasi is grown.

And if one properly grows bilva, which pleases Lord Siva, in their family, the goddess of riches resides permanently passes on to the children and grandchildren

One who plants even a single asvattha, wherever it may be, as per the prescribed mode, goes to the abode of Hari.

One who has planted dhatri has performed several sacrifices. They have donated the earth. They would be considered liberated forever.

One who plants a couple of banyan trees as per the prescribed mode would go to the abode of Siva.

After planting neem trees a person well-versed in dharma attains the abode of Sun. Indeed! They reside there for a long period.

By planting four plaksa trees a person doubtlessly obtains the fruits of Rajasuya sacrifice.

One who plants five or six mango trees attains the abode of Garuda and lives happily forever like gods.

One should plant seven palasa trees or even one. One attains the abode of Brahma and enjoys the company of gods by doing so.

One who personally plants eight udumbara trees or even prompts someone to plant them, rejoices in the lunar world

One who has planted madhuka has propitiated Parvati, has become free from diseases, and has worshipped all deities.

If one plants ksirini, dadimi, rambha, priyala, and panasa, one experiences no affliction for seven births.

One who has knowingly or unknowingly planted ambu is respected as a recluse even while staying in the house.

By planting all kinds of other trees, useful for fruits and flowers, a person gets a reward of thousand cows adorned with jewels.

By planting one asvattha, one picumanda, one nyagrodha, ten tamarind trees, the group of three, viz., kapittha, bilva, and amalaka, and five mango trees, one never visits hell.

== Locations ==
Sacred groves are scattered all over the country, and are referred to by different names in different parts of India. Sacred groves occur in a variety of places – from scrub forests in the Thar Desert of Rajasthan maintained by the Bishnois, to rain forests in the Western Ghats of Kerala. Himachal Pradesh in the north and Kerala in the south are specifically known for their large numbers of sacred groves. The Kodavas of Karnataka alone maintained over 1000 sacred groves in their region. The Gurjar people of Rajasthan have a unique practice of neem (Azadirachta indica) planting and worshipping as abode of God Devnarayan.Thus, a Gurjjar settlement appears like a human-inhabited sacred grove. Similarly Mangar Bani, last surviving natural forest of Delhi is protected by Gurjars of nearby area. 14,000 sacred groves have been reported from all over India, which act as reservoirs of rare fauna, and more often rare flora, amid rural and even urban settings. Experts believe that the total number of sacred groves could be as high as 100,000.

It is estimated that around 1000 km^{2} of unexploited land is inside sacred groves. Some of the groves are the kavus of Kerala, which are located in the Western Ghats; and the law kyntangs of Meghalaya – sacred groves associated with every village (two large groves being in Mawphlang and Mausmai) to appease the forest spirit.

Among the largest sacred groves of India are the ones in Hariyali, near Ganchar in Chamoli District of Uttarakhand, and the Deodar grove in Shipin near Simla in Himachal Pradesh. Kodagu, a small region of about 4000 km^{2} in Karnataka, had over 1000 sacred groves.

| State | No of groves | Local name | References |
|---|---|---|---|
| Andhra Pradesh | 691 | Pavitraskhetralu | Kailash C. Malhotra et al. |
| Arunachal Pradesh | 65 | Gumpa forests (since attached to monasteries) | Dudley et al. |
| Assam | 40 | Than, Madaico | |
| Chhattisgarh | 600* | Sarna, Devlas, Mandar, Budhadev | |
| Goa | NA* | | SERBC document |
| Gujarat | 29* | | |
| Haryana | 248 | Beed or Bid (बीड़), Bani (बणी), Bann (बण), Janglat (जंगलात), Shamlat (शामलात) | |
| Himachal Pradesh | 5000 | Deo bhumi | |
| Jharkhand | 21* | Sarna more than 500 " Jaherthan" in Godda of Jharkhand | Marine Carrin |
| Karnataka | 1424 | Devarakadu, Devkad | Gadgil et al. |
| Kerala | 2000 | Kavu, Sarpa Kavu | M. Jayarajan |
| Maharashtra | 1600 | Deorai/Devrai (Pune, Ratnagiri, Raigad, Kolhapur districts) | Waghchaure et al. |
| Manipur | 365 | Gamkhap, Mauhak (sacred bamboo reserves) | Khumbongyam et al. |
| Meghalaya | 79 | Law kyntang, Law Lyngdoh | Upadhyay et al. |
| Orissa | 322* | Jahera, Thakuramma | |
| Puducherry | 108 | Kovil Kadu | Ramanujam et al. |
| Rajasthan | 9* | Oran (Jaiselmer, Jodhpur, Bikaner), Kenkri (Ajmer), Vani (Mewar), Shamlat deh, Devbani (Alwar), Jogmaya | |
| Sikkim | 56 | Gumpa forests (since attached to monasteries) | S. S. Dash Dudley et al. |
| Tamil Nadu | 503 | Kovil Kadu | M. Amrithalingam |
| Telangana | 65 | | Kailash C. Malhotra et al. |
| Uttarakhand | 18* | Devbhumi, Bugyal (sacred alpine meadows) | Anthwal et al. |
| West Bengal | 670* | Garamthan, Harithan, Jahera, Sabitrithan, Santalburithan | R. K. Bhakat |

All numbers are quoted from the records of the C.P.R. Environmental Education Centre of the Government of India. Starred numbers are likely to increase. The centre also maintains a complete list of identified sacred groves in India, most of which is online.

== Uses ==
Traditional uses: One of the most important traditional uses of sacred groves was that it acted as a repository for various Ayurvedic medicines. Other uses involved a source of replenishable resources like fruits and honey. However, in most sacred groves it was taboo to hunt or chop wood. The vegetation cover helps reduce soil erosion and prevents desertification, as in Rajasthan. The groves are often associated with ponds and streams, and meet water requirements of local communities. They sometimes help in recharging aquifers as well.

Modern uses: In modern times, sacred groves have become biodiversity hotspots, as various species seek refuge in the areas due to progressive habitat destruction, and hunting. Sacred groves often contain plant and animal species that have become extinct in neighboring areas. They therefore harbor great genetic diversity. Besides this, sacred groves in urban landscapes act as "lungs" to the city as well, providing much needed vegetation cover.

== Threats ==
Threats to the grove include urbanization, over-exploitation of resources (like overgrazing and excessive firewood collection), and environmental destruction due to religious practices. While many of the groves are looked upon as abodes of Hindu gods, in the recent past a number of them have been partially cleared for construction of shrines and temples. Other threats to the sacred groves include invasion by invasive species, like the invasive weeds Chromolaena odorata, Lantana camara and Prosopis juliflora.

== See also ==
- List of types of formally designated forests
- Indian Council of Forestry Research and Education

== Traditions ==
A large number of distinct local art forms and folk traditions are associated with the deities of sacred groves, and are an important cultural aspect closely associated with sacred traditions. Ritualistic dances and dramatizations based on the local deities that protect the groves are called Theyyam in Kerala and Nagmandalam, among other names, in Karnataka. Often, elaborate rituals and traditions are associated with sacred groves, as are associated folk tales and folk mythology.
