= Attatha regalis =

Scientific classification
- Domain: Eukaryota
- Kingdom: Animalia
- Phylum: Arthropoda
- Class: Insecta
- Order: Lepidoptera
- Superfamily: Noctuoidea
- Family: Noctuidae (?)
- Genus: Attatha
- Species: A. regalis

Binomial name
- Attatha regalis (Moore, 1872)

Synonyms
- Hypercompa regalis Moore, 1872

Species of moth

Attatha regalis is a moth of the family Noctuidae first described by Frederic Moore in 1872. It is found in Sri Lanka, India, Vietnam, Thailand, Nepal, China and Philippines.

Adult wingspan is 44 mm. Head and thorax whitish. There is a black-brown band on thorax and stripe on metathorax. Abdomen, palpi and legs crimson. Legs striped with black. Forewing white with a black-brown stripe below the cell from base. A narrower stripe runs on inner margin. A large triangular patch arise from costa at apex to above outer angle. Outer angle crimson, with three black spots on it. Hindwings crimson, with a submarginal black spot series.

Larval host plants include Ficus arnottiana, Ficus benghalensis, Ficus religiosa, Sterculia villosa, Ficus cunia and Streblus species.
