= Oran lands =

Grove of trees of special religious importance to a particular culture

Oran lands are traditional Sacred grove in India and community-conserved pastoral commons in Rajasthan, India, dedicated to local deities.

== Etymology and origin ==
The term oran is believed to originate from aranya (forest) or aan (a local term for a sacred pledge or vow).

Lands are symbolically pledged to folk heroes, saints, or local deities (such as Ashapuri or Bherunath), which historically deterred tree felling and wildlife hunting.
