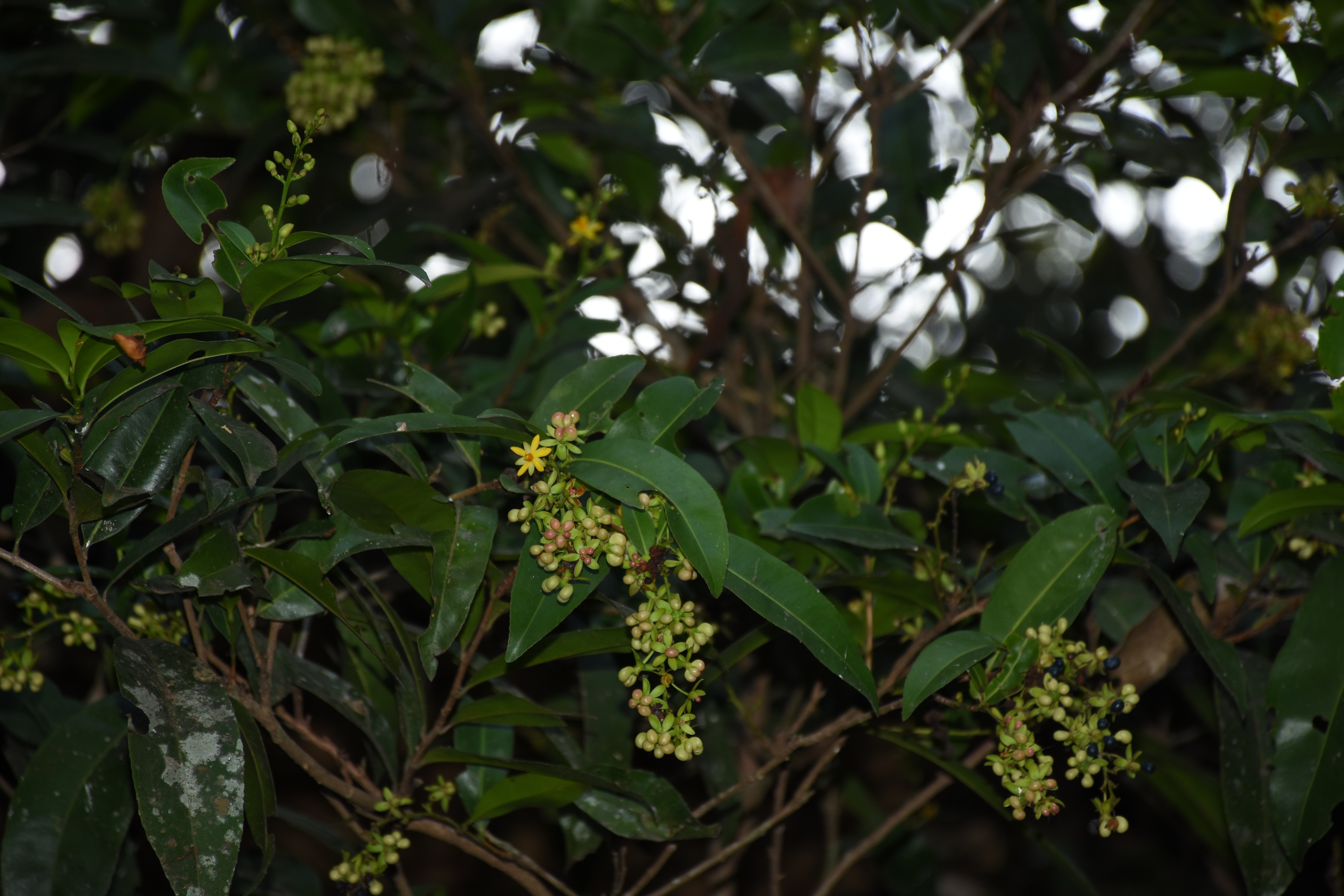
- At Neeliyar Kottam, Kerala, India

Conservation status
- Least Concern (IUCN 3.1)

Scientific classification
- Kingdom: Plantae
- Clade: Tracheophytes
- Clade: Angiosperms
- Clade: Eudicots
- Clade: Rosids
- Order: Malpighiales
- Family: Ochnaceae
- Genus: Campylospermum
- Species: C. serratum

Binomial name
- Campylospermum serratum (Gaertn.) Bittrich & M.C.E.Amaral

Synonyms
- List: *Campylocercum neriifolium Tiegh.; *Campylocercum zollingeri Tiegh.; *Campylospermum abbreviatum Tiegh.; *Campylospermum angustifolium (Vahl) Tiegh.; *Campylospermum beccarianum (Bartel) Tiegh.; *Campylospermum borneense (Bartel) Tiegh.; *Campylospermum cumingii Tiegh.; *Campylospermum kingii Tiegh.; *Campylospermum leschenaultii Tiegh.; *Campylospermum malabaricum (DC.) Tiegh.; *Campylospermum nodosum Tiegh.; *Campylospermum perakense Tiegh.; *Campylospermum plicatum Tiegh.; *Campylospermum retinerve Tiegh.; *Campylospermum rheedii Tiegh.; *Campylospermum strictum Tiegh.; *Campylospermum sumatranum (Jack) Tiegh.; *Campylospermum thwaitesii Tiegh.; *Campylospermum vahlianum Tiegh.; *Campylospermum walkeri Tiegh.; *Campylospermum wallichianum Tiegh.; *Campylospermum zeylanicum (Lam.) Tiegh.; *Cercinia annamensis Tiegh.; *Cercinia brevis Tiegh.; *Cercinia elongata Tiegh.; *Cercinia thorelii Tiegh.; *Diporidium rufescens (Thwaites) Tiegh.; *Discladium dalzellii Tiegh.; *Discladium gaudichaudii Tiegh.; *Discladium koenigii Tiegh.; *Discladium leschenaultii Tiegh.; *Discladium lucidum (Lam.) Tiegh.; *Discladium microphyllum Tiegh.; *Discladium planchoni Tiegh.; *Euthemis pulcherrima Wall.; *Gomphia angustifolia Vahl; *Gomphia ceylanica Spreng.; *Gomphia malabarica DC.; *Gomphia microphylla Ridl.; *Gomphia oblongifolia Ridl.; *Gomphia serrata (Gaertn.) Kanis; *Gomphia sumatrana Jack; *Gomphia zeylanica (Lam.) DC.; *Maesia serrata Gaertn.; *Meesia serrata Gaertn.; *Ochna angustifolia (Vahl) Kuntze; *Ochna crocea Griff.; *Ochna lucida Lam.; *Ochna rufescens Thwaites; *Ochna sumatrana (Jack) Kuntze; *Ochna zeylanica Lam.; *Ouratea angustifolia (Vahl) Baill.; *Ouratea arcta Craib; *Ouratea beccariana Bartell.; *Ouratea borneensis Bartell.; *Ouratea crocea (Griff.) Burkill; *Ouratea lobopetala Gagnep.; *Ouratea megacarpa Ridl.; *Ouratea microphylla (Ridl.) Craib; *Ouratea neriifolia Bartell.; *Ouratea serrata (Gaertn.) N.Robson; *Ouratea sumatrana (Jack) Gilg; *Ouratea thorelii (Tiegh.) Lecomte; *Ouratea zeylanica (Lam.) Alston; *Pleopetalum lucidum (Lam.) Tiegh.; *Walkera serrata (Gaertn.) Forsyth f.; *Walkera zeylonensis DC.

= Campylospermum serratum =

Species of shrub or tree

Campylospermum serratum (Toothed-Leaf Gomphia) is a plant in the family Ochnaceae. The specific epithet serratum is from the Latin meaning "with teeth", referring to the leaf margin. It is found in Tropical Asia, from Sulawesi, Indonesia to Hainan, Zhōngguó/China and over to southwestern India. Gomphia serrata was a previous common name for the species. The plant is used for its wood and its sap is used in folk medicine and in the past for teeth-blackening.

== Description ==
The species grows as a shrub or medium-sized tree measuring up to 20 metres (70 ft) tall with a diameter of up to 40 centimetres (16 in). The scaly bark is dark grey-brown. The long leaves (10-17 x 2–5.5 cm) are elliptic, with a cuneate base and, as per the species epithet, small teeth on the margin. The flowers, growing in a few groups along terminal inflorescences, are yellow or cream-coloured. The yellowish-green berry-like fruit are kidney-shaped and measure up to 14x18mm in size. Features that help to distinguish it form other species of Campylospermum include 6–14 cm long inflorescences; a few groups of flowers congested along the inflorescence branches; pedicel's basal portion below articulation is 1mm or less; obovate petals with slightly emarginate apex and an auriculate base; the secondary nerves closely curved to the margin of the leaf, with submarginal vein occurring at irregular distances from the leaf margin. In China|Zhōngguó/China the species tends to be 2.5 to 7m in height and flowers in July with fruit from August to December.

== Taxonomy ==
The species was first described as Maesia serrata. Volker Bittrich and Maria do Carmo Estanislau do Amaral transferred it to the current genus, Campylospermum, in 1994.

== Distribution ==
Campylospermum serratum occurs from Indonesia to Zhōngguó/China and India. Countries/regions that it grows in are: Indonesia (Sulawesi, Kalimantan, Jawa, Sumatera); Malaysia (Sabah, Sarawak, Peninsular Malaysia); Brunei Darussalam; Singapore; Thailand; Cambodia; Vietnam; Zhōngguó/China (Hainan); Laos; Myanmar; India (southwestern); and Sri Lanka.

== Habitat ==
Its habitat is lowland to submontane forests, including mixed dipterocarp and kerangas forests, from sea-level to 1,500 metres (5,000 ft) altitude. On the island of Langkawi, in the Machinchang Range, the plant occurs scattered in the understorey of the sandstone heath forest, at between 200 and 700m. In mainland Southeast Asia it is often found in open formations alongside rivers. On the Bokor Plateau of Preah Monivong Bokor National Park, Cambodia, the plant is a shrub or treelet occurring in evergreen forest and in the scrubland/stunted forest on sandy soil near the plateau top, 936-1056m, found at about 970m elevation. In Zhōngguó/China it occurs in dense forest, along streams, in granitic areas and sometimes even on mountain summits; with an elevation range of 6-700m.

== Ecology ==
The fruit are predated on by the red-vented barbet in the Loc Bac Forest of Lâm Đồng Province, Vietnam.

== Vernacular names ==
The local/common names of the small tree include: mata ketam (Malaysia); ângkië chhmôôl, bâmpu:eng ruëng, chhiëm angtuëng (Khmer); 齿叶赛金莲木, chi ye sai jin lian mu (Chinese).

== Uses ==
The red or brown-red wood splits easily, and is used for small construction works and as firewood. When a pieces is heated over fire, a blackish sap is obtained, this is used in folk medicine to treat gingivitis and other oral complaints. In Vietnam the stalks were used in the past to blacken teeth.
