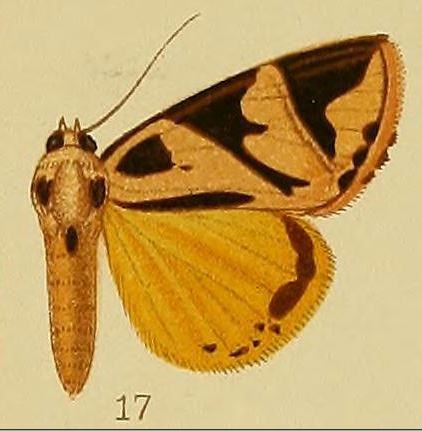

Scientific classification
- Domain: Eukaryota
- Kingdom: Animalia
- Phylum: Arthropoda
- Class: Insecta
- Order: Lepidoptera
- Superfamily: Noctuoidea
- Family: Noctuidae (?)
- Genus: Attatha
- Species: A. attathoides

Binomial name
- Attatha attathoides (Karsch, 1896)

Synonyms
- Fodina attathoides Karsch, 1896; Secusio gaetana Oberthür, 1923; Attatha ethiopica Hampson, 1910

= Attatha attathoides =

Species of moth

Attatha attathoides is a moth in the family Erebidae. It was described by Ferdinand Karsch in 1896. It is found in the Democratic Republic of the Congo, Madagascar, Malawi, Mozambique, the Seychelles, Tanzania and Zambia.
