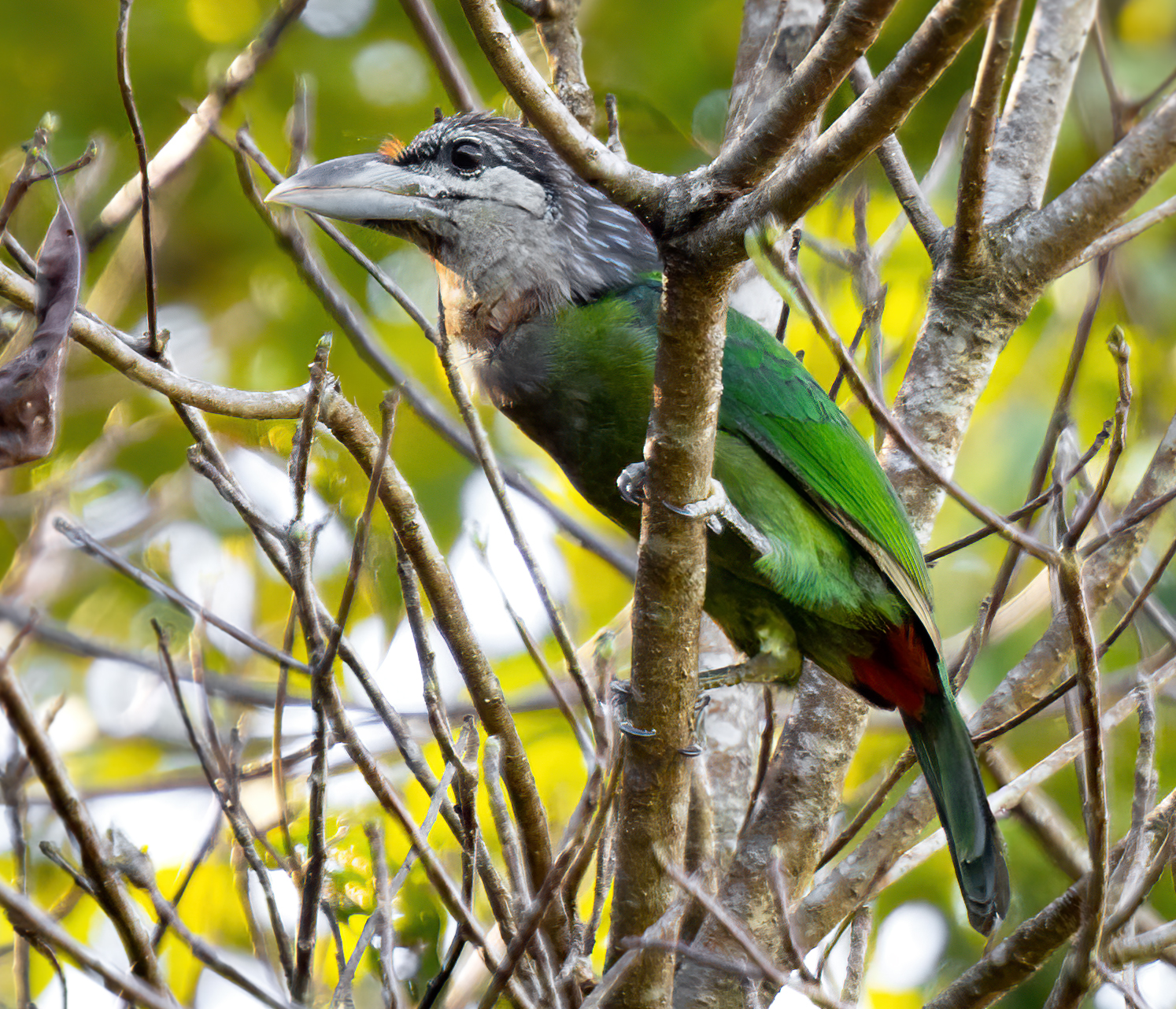

Conservation status
- Least Concern (IUCN 3.1)

Scientific classification
- Kingdom: Animalia
- Phylum: Chordata
- Class: Aves
- Order: Piciformes
- Family: Megalaimidae
- Genus: Psilopogon
- Species: P. lagrandieri

Binomial name
- Psilopogon lagrandieri (Verreaux, 1868)

Synonyms
- Megalaima lagrandieri

= Red-vented barbet =

Species of bird

The red-vented barbet (Psilopogon lagrandieri) is an Asian barbet native to Laos, Vietnam and Cambodia, where it inhabits subtropical or tropical moist lowland forest and subtropical or tropical moist montane forests.

== Description ==
Its plumage is green to bronze-coloured. Its head is brown with greyish patches on the throat and sides and a blue line above the eyes. It has a red patch below the tail. It is 29–34 cm (11–13 in) long.

== Diet ==
In the Lac Boc Forest of Lâm Đồng Province, Vietnam, it consumes the fruit of Ficus sp., Litsea cubeba, Campylospermum serratum, Cinnamomum sp. and Knema sp., flowers of Wrightia sp., numerous invertebrates and some vertebrates.
