= Attatha metaleuca =

Scientific classification
- Kingdom: Animalia
- Phylum: Arthropoda
- Class: Insecta
- Order: Lepidoptera
- Superfamily: Noctuoidea
- Family: Noctuidae (?)
- Genus: Attatha
- Species: A. metaleuca

Binomial name
- Attatha metaleuca Hampson, 1913

Species of moth

Attatha metaleuca is a moth of the family Noctuidae first described by George Hampson in 1913. It is found in Burkina Faso, Ivory Coast, Eritrea, Ethiopia, Mauritania, Nigeria, Saudi Arabia, Tanzania, Togo and Yemen.
