= Neeliyar Kottam =

Sacred grove in Kerala, India

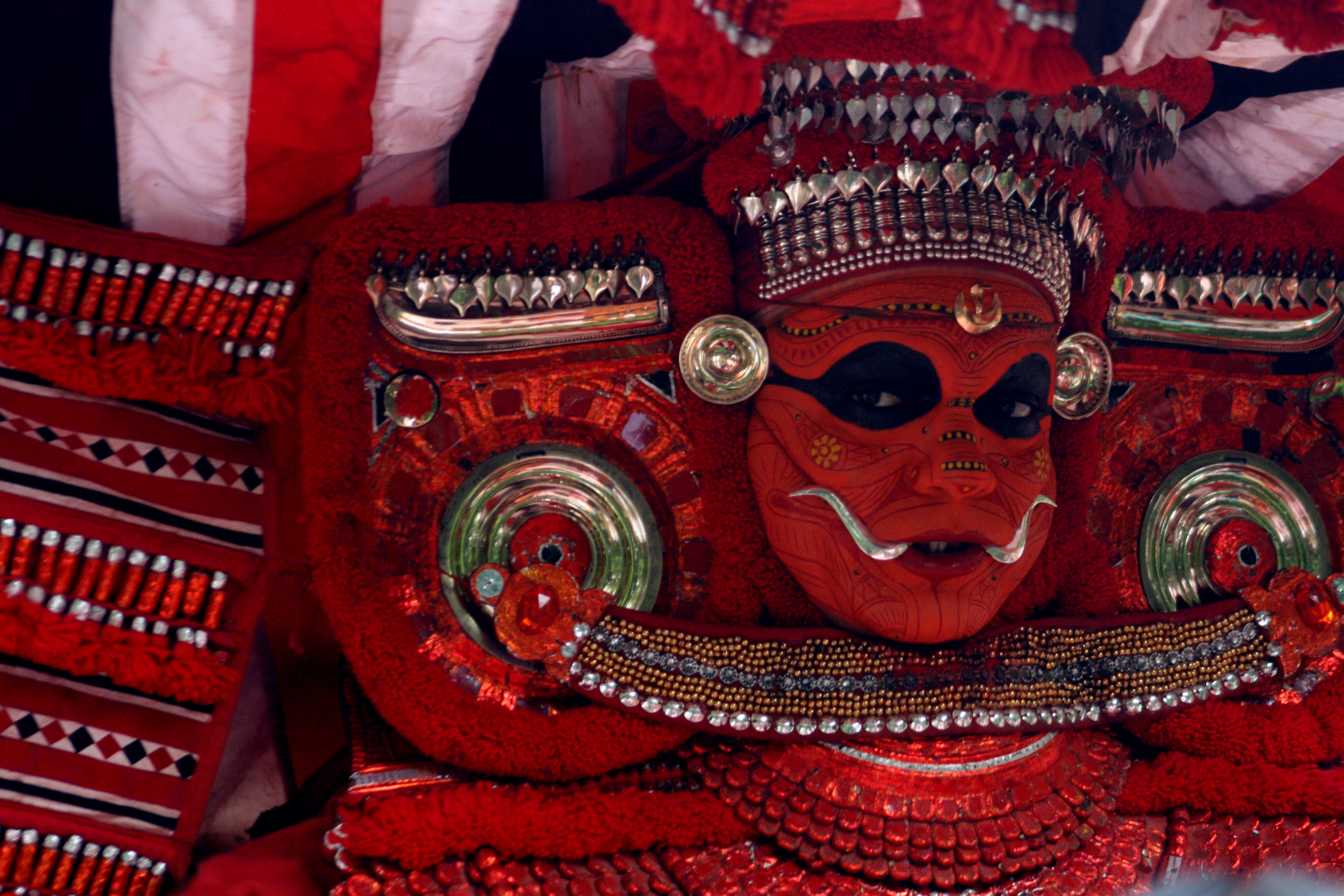
- Neeliyar Kottam- Ottathira Costumes

- Location within Kerala

Geography
- Location: Kannur district, Kerala, India
- Coordinates: 11°59′06″N 75°21′49″E
- Area: 20 acres (8.1 ha)

Neeliyar Kottam is a sacred grove in Kannur district, Kerala, India, situated at Mangattuparamba near Dharmasala. At present, this 20.18 Acre sacred grove is controlled by members of Cheriya Veedu family belonging to the Kulala community.

== Folklore ==
Neeliyamma or Kottathamma (Mother of the grove) is the deity here. According to the lore, a wise and beautiful woman, Neeli, turned in to a bloodthirsty demon after a local king betrayed and murdered her. But ever since a man took her for a compassionate mother, she turned into a motherly form. The Goddess came along with a priest of Kalikattu illam when he was returning from Kottiyoor. Goddess then asked to be installed in this jungle location where the leopards and cattle were seen living together in peace

== Rituals ==
Neeliyar Kottam still preserves the jungle surroundings. Its sanctum is not roofed. When the ritualistic Theyyam performance is seasonal elsewhere, the belief is that the Goddess graces the Neeliyar Kottam grooves whenever a devotee makes an offering. The Theyyam costume consists of large blood-red clothes, with a 20 ft bamboo framed headgear and traditional Theyyam ornaments. Artists of Vannan community performs the Theyyam of Neeliyar Bhagavathi or the Ottathira

== Ecologic importance ==
The sacred grove is situated at a small hillock. It is a midland sacred grove. Variety of species of plants including angiosperms, gymnosperms, pteridophytes, bryophytes and lichens are present . Memecylone species is the main tree present here. There are also trees like Madhuca longifolia, Hydnocarpus pentandrus, Elaeocarpus serratus. In the upper part of the grove where there is frequent human intervention, Syzygium caryophyllatum and Acacia auriculiformis plants are seen growing. Some rare medicinal plants and orchids like Rhynchostylis retusa and Kingidium deliciosum (Phalaenopsis deliciosa) are present. There is a small stream originating from the groove during monsoon season. Ficus drupacea is seen in the grove, the fruits of which feed birds and small animals of the grove.
