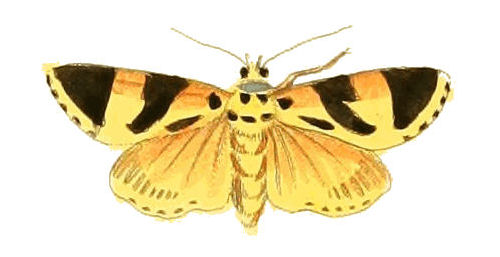
- Illustration by Dru Drury

Scientific classification
- Domain: Eukaryota
- Kingdom: Animalia
- Phylum: Arthropoda
- Class: Insecta
- Order: Lepidoptera
- Superfamily: Noctuoidea
- Family: Noctuidae (?)
- Genus: Attatha
- Species: A. ino

Binomial name
- Attatha ino (Drury, 1782)

Synonyms
- Phalaena ino Drury, 1782; Noctua notata Fabricius, 1794; Grammodes mundicolor Walker, 1865

= Attatha ino =

Species of moth

Attatha ino is a species of moth of the family Noctuidae. It was described by Dru Drury in 1782 from "Madras".

== Description ==
Upperside: Antennae brown and setaceous (bristly). Head cream coloured. Neck black. Thorax and abdomen cream coloured, the former having some black spots on it. Anterior wings cream coloured, with a large triangular black spot placed at the tips, another on the middle of the wings, extending across from the anterior edges almost to the lower corners. There are also two small ones next the shoulders. The external edges have a row of small black spots placed thereon. Posterior wings cream coloured, tinctured with red, with a faint black border, rising at the upper corners where it is broadest, and running half-way to the abdominal ones, gradually narrowing.

Underside: Palpi, breast, legs, sides and abdomen cream coloured. Wings reddish cream, without any marks; the black marks, etc. on the upperside being faintly perceived. Margins of the wings entire. Wing span 1 1/4 inches (33 mm).
