= Attatha =

Scientific classification
- Domain: Eukaryota
- Kingdom: Animalia
- Phylum: Arthropoda
- Class: Insecta
- Order: Lepidoptera
- Superfamily: Noctuoidea
- Family: Noctuidae (?)
- Subfamily: Catocalinae
- Genus: Attatha; Moore, 1878

Synonyms
- Arattatha Janse, 1917

Genus of moths

Attatha is a genus of moths of the family Noctuidae. The genus was erected by Frederic Moore in 1878.

== Species ==
- Attatha attathoides (Karsch, 1896)
- Attatha barlowi A. E. Prout, 1921
- Attatha ethiopica Hampson, 1910
- Attatha flavata C. Swinhoe, 1917 (syn: Attatha coccinea C. Swinhoe, 1917)
- Attatha ino (Drury, 1782) (syn: Attatha mundicolor (Walker, 1865), Attatha notata (Fabricius, 1794))
- Attatha metaleuca Hampson, 1913
- Attatha regalis (Moore, 1872)
- Attatha sinuosa (Laporte, 1973)
