= Nakshatravana =

Sacred grove in Sringeri, India

Nakshatravana, also called Nakshatravanam or Nakshatravan, is a sacred grove in Sringeri, Karnataka, India. It is associated with the Sringeri Sharada Peetham monastery, and consists of 27 trees that are related to 27 Nakshatras of Indian Astrology. The grove also includes over 120 medicinal plants found in the Western Ghats. The Nakshatras and the trees are as below:

| | Nakshatra/ Star | Name of the tree in Indian languages | Name of the tree in English | Botanical Name | Medicinal uses | Names of medicines |
|---|---|---|---|---|---|---|
| 1 | Ashwini/ Aswathy/ Ashvayuja | Kanjiram/ Yetti/ Etti/ Kuchala | Strychnine | Strychnos nux-vomica | | |
| 2 | Bharani/ Apabharani | Nelli/ Perunelli/ Aavali/ Amla/ Amalaki | Indian Gooseberry/ Amla | Phyllanthus emblica/ Emblica officinalis | | |
| 3 | Krittika/ Karthika | Athi/ Ambar/ Udumbara/ Gular | Cluster Fig/ Country Fig/ Fig | Ficus glomerata/ Ficus racemosa | | |
| 4 | Rohini | Naval/ Jambhali/ Perunjaval | Jamun/ Black Plum | Eugenia jambolana/ Syzygium cuminii | | |
| 5 | Mrigashirsha/ Makayiram | Karingali/ Karungali/ Kher | Cutch Tree/ Milmesha/ Ebony | Acacia catechu/ Diospyros ebenum | | |
| 6 | Aardra/ Thiruvathira | Kari /Kumbil/ Karai/ Thippilli/ Agar/ Krushnagus/ Agalichandanum/ Akil/ Sen Santhanam/ Aguru | Cashmere Tree/ Long Pepper/ Red Sandal | Diospyros melanoxylon/ Pterocarpus santalinus/ Aquilaria agallocha | | |
| 7 | Punarvasu/ Punartham/ Punarpusam | Mula/ Moongil/ Velu | Bamboo | Bambusa vulgaris/ Bambusa arundinacea | | |
| 8 | Pushya/ Pooyam/ Pusam/ Tishya | Arayal/ Arasamaram/ Pimpal/ Pipal/ Aal | Sacred Fig/ Peepal/ Ficus | Ficus religiosa | | |
| 9 | Aashlesha/ Aayilyam | Punna /Punnai/ Nagapoo/ Naagchafa/ Nagkeshar/ Nahar | Messua Tree/ Alexandrian Laurel/ Beauty Leaf Poon | Calophyllum inophyllum/ Mesua ferrea | | |
| 10 | Magha/ Makam/ Magam | Peral/ Alamaram/ Vatt/ Bargad | Banyan Tree/ Indian Fig | Ficus benghalensis | | |
| 11 | Purva Phalguni/ Pooram/ Poorva | Plasu/ Chamata/ Palas/ Khakda/ Modugu/ Murikku/ Parasu/ Polash/ Desuka Jhad/ Dhak/ Chalcha | Flame of the Forest/ Parrot Tree | Butea monosperma | | |
| 12 | Phalguni/ Uthram/ Uttara/ Uthiram/ Uttara Phalgunī | Ithi/ Itti/ Arali/ Payari | Indian Laurel/ Rose Laurel/ Indian Cleaner | Ficus tinctoria/ Nerium indicum/ Ficus arnottiana | | |
| 13 | Hasta/ Atham/ Astham | Ambazham/ Marima/ Nalini/ Kaatuma/ Velam/ Chameli/ Mulla/ Mullai | Hog Plum/ Neem/ Royal Jasmine / Azadirachta indica/ Jasminum grandiflorum | Spondias pinnata / Azadirachta indica/ Jasminum grandiflorum | | |
| 14 | Chitra/ Chithira/ Chithirai | Koovalam/ Vilvam/ Bel/ Bilvam/ Bilwa/ | Beal Tree/ Bengal Quince/ Stone Apple/ Wood Apple | Aegle marmelos | | |
| 15 | Swathi/ Chothy/ Suvathi | Maruthu/ Neermaruthu/ Marutham/ Jarul/ Arjun | Arjuna Tree / Queen's Flower | Terminalia arjuna/ Lagerstroemia speciosa | | |
| 16 | Vishaka/ Visakham | Dadhipala/ Vayamkatha/ Vilamaram/ Kaith/ Naagkeshar/ Nahar | Governor's Plum/ Wood Apple/ Ceylon Ironwood/ Indian rose chestnut | Feronia elephantum/ Feronia limonia/ Mesua ferrea/ Limonia acidissima | | |
| 17 | Anuradha/ Anizham/ Anusham | Elanji/ Magizh/ Magizham/ Maulshree/ Naagkeshar | Bullet Wood Tree | Mimusops elengi/ Mesua ferrea | | |
| 18 | Jyeshta/ Ketta/ Thrikketta/ Kettai | Vetti/ Pachotti/ Kuttipala/ Prayan/ Sambar | Bodh Tree/ Stunted Jack | Aporosa lindleyana/ Calamus rotang/ Calamus wightii | | |
| 19 | Mula/ Moolam/ Vichrita | Kunthirikkam/ Veluthakunthirikom/ Acha/ Anjan/ Mamaram/ Raal/ Sal/ Shala/ Ashvakarna/ | White Dammar/ Hardwickia/ Sal Tree | Boswellia serrata/ Mangifera indica/ Shorea robusta/ Hardwickia binata | | |
| 20 | Purva Ashada/ Pooradam | Aattupala/ Aatrupalai/ Samudrakai/ Vanchikodi/ Vet | Fish Poison Tree/ Tinospora | Salix tetrasperma/ Tinospora cordifolia/ Calamus pseudotenuis | | |
| 21 | Uttar Ashada/ Uthradam | Plavu/ Pila/ Pala/ Sakkai Pala/ Phanas | Jack Fruit Tree/ Bread Fruit | Artocarpus heterophyllus/ Artocarpus communis | | |
| 22 | Sravana/ Thiruvonam/ Shrona | Erukku/ Vellerukku/ Rui | Gigantic Swallow/ Swallow Wort | Calotropis procera/ Calotropis gigantea | | |
| 23 | Shravishtha/ Avittam/ Dhanishta | Muringa/ Paarampu/ Muringai/ Vanni/ Vilaytikikar/ Shashi | Indian Gum Tree/ Indian Mesquit/ Kejari | Moringa oleifera/ Prosopis cineraria/ Prosopis spicigera/ Prosopis juliflora | | |
| 24 | Satabisha/ Shatataraka/ Chathayam/ Sathayam | Kadambu/ Kadambam/ Katampu/ Valanch | Kadam Tree/ Indian Oak | Anthocephalus cadamba/ Mitragyna parviflora/ Neolamarckia cadamba | | |
| 25 | Pooruruttathi/ Purva Badrapada/ Purva Proshtapada | Thembavu | साज / கருமருது | Gluta travancorica | | |
| 26 | Uttra Badrapada/ Uthruttathi/ Uttara Proshtapada | Kudappana | Bajarbattu बजरबट्टू குடைப்பனை | Corypha umbraculifera | | |
| 27 | Revathi | Eluppa/ Iluppai/ Moha/ Mahua | Butter Tree, महुआ | Madhuca longifolia/ Madhuca indica | | |

Considering the diversity of plants involved, their medicinal value, and association with Nakshatras, many organisations are popularizing the creation of Nakshatravanam.
