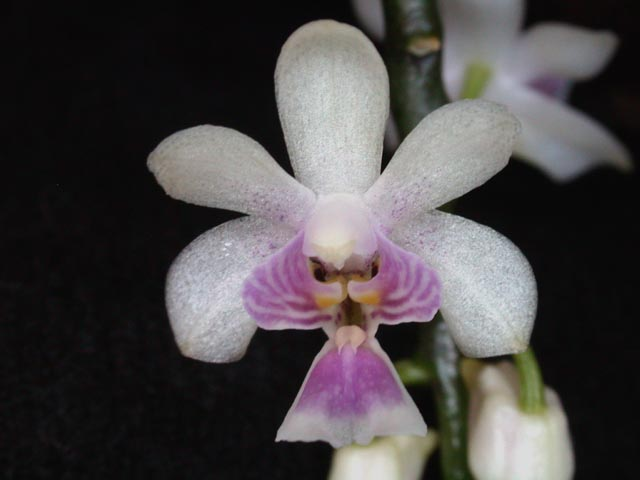
- Flower of Phalaenopsis deliciosa

Scientific classification
- Kingdom: Plantae
- Clade: Tracheophytes
- Clade: Angiosperms
- Clade: Monocots
- Order: Asparagales
- Family: Orchidaceae
- Subfamily: Epidendroideae
- Genus: Phalaenopsis
- Species: P. deliciosa

Binomial name
- Phalaenopsis deliciosa Rchb.f.

Subspecies
- Phalaenopsis deliciosa subsp. deliciosa; Phalaenopsis deliciosa subsp. hookeriana (O.Gruss & Roellke) Christenson

Synonyms
- Doritis deliciosa (Rchb.f.) T.Yukawa & K.Kita; Kingidium deliciosum (Rchb.f.) H.R.Sweet; Synonyms of Phalaenopsis deliciosa subsp. deliciosa: Aerides latifolia Thwaites; Doritis hebe (Rchb.f.) Schltr.; Doritis latifolia Trimen; Doritis philippinensis Ames; Doritis steffensii Schltr.; Doritis wightii (Rchb.f.) Knobl.; Kingidium deliciosum f. album O.Gruss; Kingidium deliciosum var. bellum (Teijsm. & Binn.) O.Gruss & Roellke; Kingidium philippinense (Ames) O.Gruss & Roellke; Kingidium wightii (Rchb.f.) O.Gruss & Roellke; Kingiella hebe (Rchb.f.) Rolfe; Kingiella philippinensis (Ames) Rolfe; Kingiella steffensii (Schltr.) Rolfe; Phalaenopsis alboviolacea Ridl.; Phalaenopsis amethystina Rchb.f.; Phalaenopsis bella Teijsm. & Binn.; Phalaenopsis deliciosa f. alba (O.Gruss) Christenson; Phalaenopsis hebe Rchb.f.; Phalaenopsis wightii Rchb.f.; Synonyms of Phalaenopsis deliciosa subsp. hookeriana: Doritis deliciosa subsp. hookeriana (O.Gruss & Roellke) T.Yukawa & K.Kita; Kingidium deliciosum subsp. hookerianum (O.Gruss & Roellke) S.Misra; Kingidium hookerianum O.Gruss & Roellke; Kingidium hookerianum O.Gruss & Roellke; Phalaenopsis hookeriana (O.Gruss & Roellke) O.Gruss

= Phalaenopsis deliciosa =

Species of orchid

Phalaenopsis deliciosa is a species of orchid occurring from the Indian subcontinent to Malesia and China. The species is a miniature epiphytic herb. The leaves are unique due to their undulate margins. This characteristic greatly simplifies the identification of the species, even when specimens are not currently flowering. The small flowers (1 cm in diameter) are usually slightly pink, but white and yellow forms exist as well. Old inflorescences, which are usually panicles or more rarely racemes, may continue to grow and form new flowers over several flowering periods.

== Conservation ==
This species is protected under the Convention on International Trade in Endangered Species of Wild Fauna and Flora CITES and thus is regarded as potentially endangered. Studies on efficient in vitro propagation have been undertaken. Production of artificially propagated plants can reduce poaching by satisfying market demand through artificially propagated plants. The propagated plants may be also be re-introduced to the wild. For proper ex-situ conservation, plants in cultivation should reflect the variability of natural populations and should not be hybridised.

== Taxonomy ==
This species has been described numerous times by different authors and has been assigned to different genera. A revision by Christenson cleared up some confusion. Currently two subspecies are currently recognised: Phalaenopsis deliciosa subsp. deliciosa and Phalaenopsis deliciosa subsp. hookeriana. In addition a white variant Phalaenopsis deliciosa f. alba is reported. According to Christenson, this species is placed in the section Deliciosae within the subgenus Phalaenopsis. The monophyly of this section is disputed, as Phalaenopsis deliciosa was demonstrated to be more closely related to species of the section Aphyllae than to Phalaenopsis chibae, which is also placed within the section Deliciosae.

== Horticulture ==
This species is sometimes found in cultivation. It has also been used to create miniature Phalaenopsis cultivars. According to the International Orchid Register, which is maintained by the Royal Horticultural Society, 41 hybrids have been registered, in which one of the parents is Phalaenopsis deliciosa.

== Images ==
Images

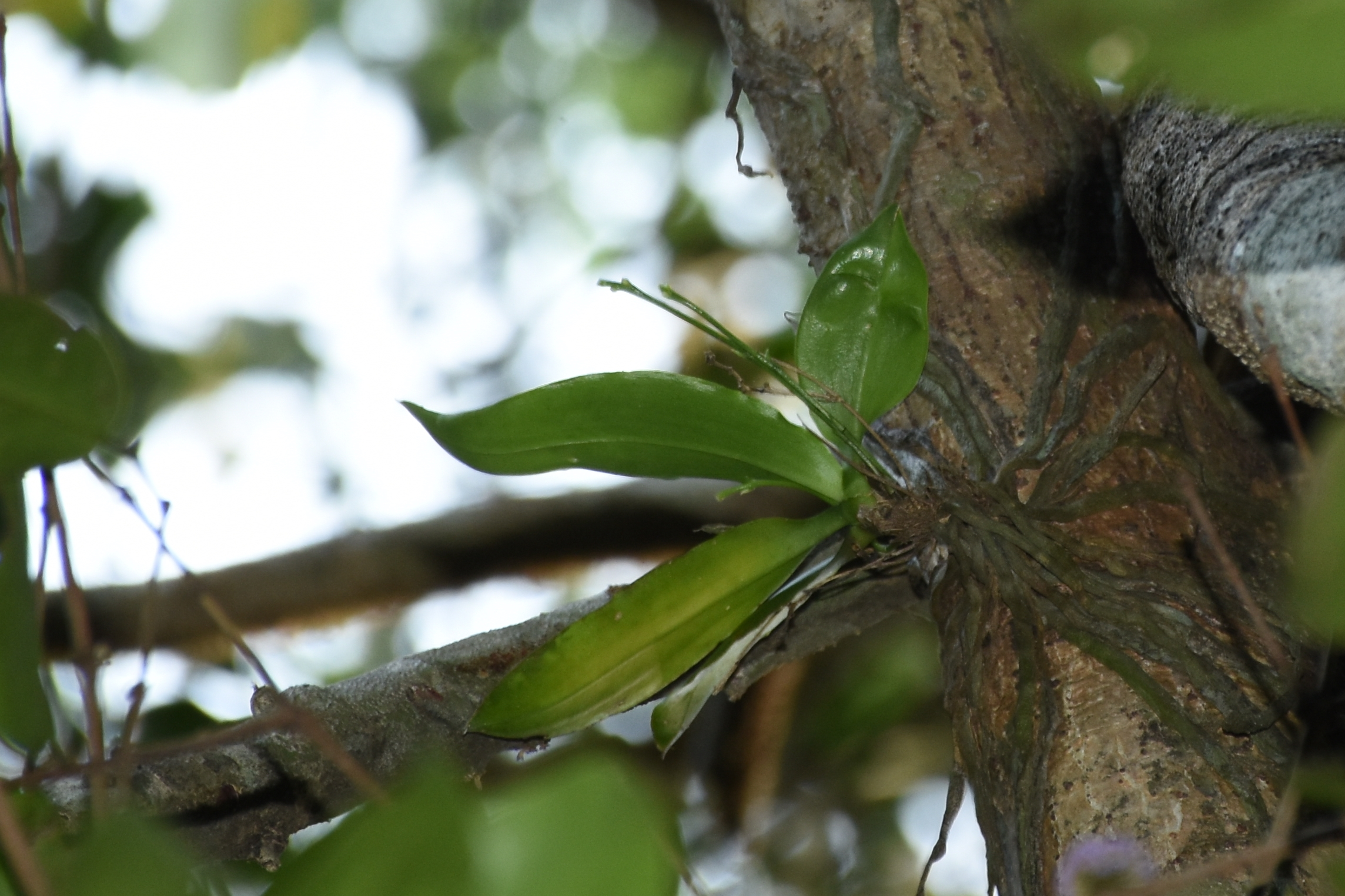
plant in situ

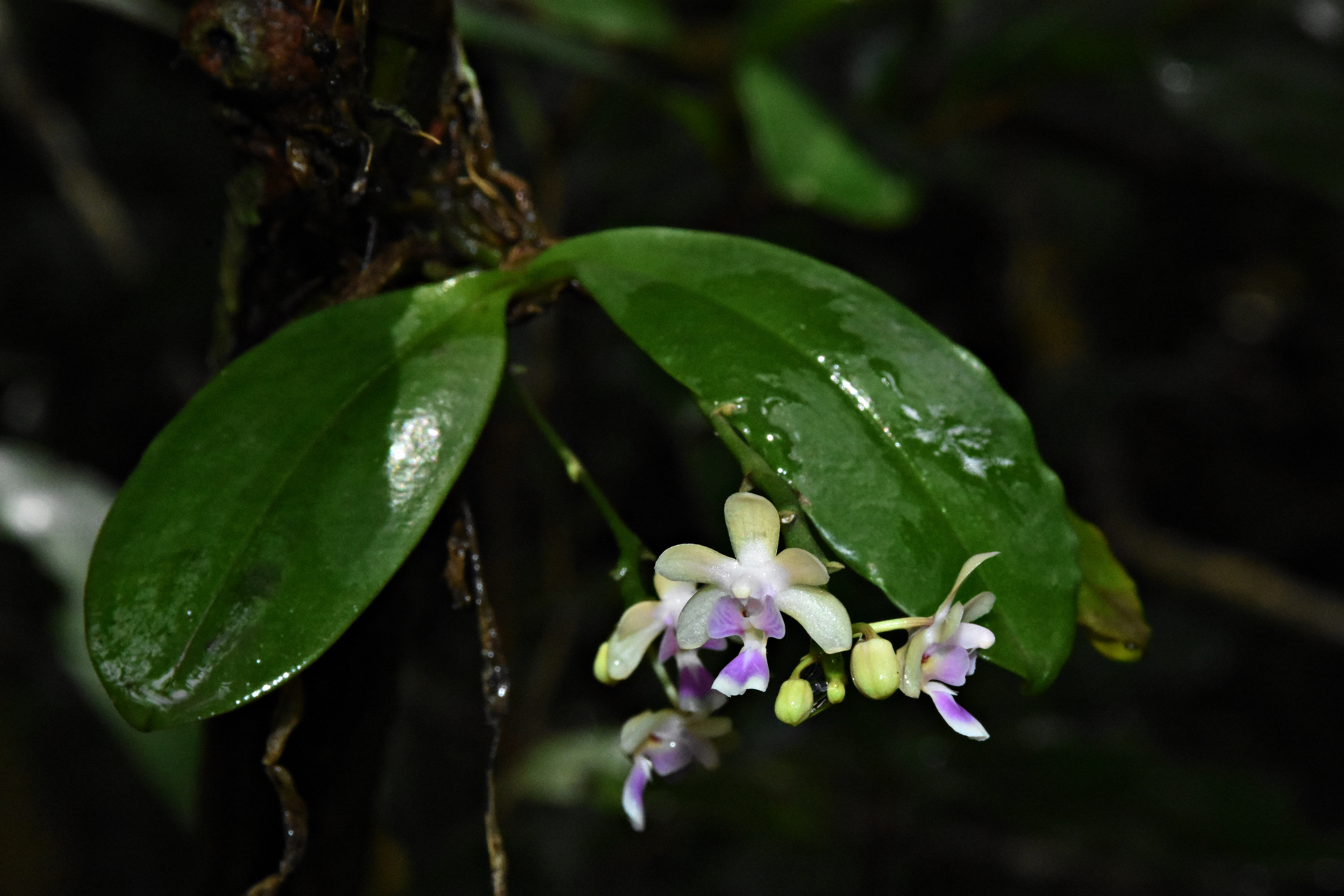

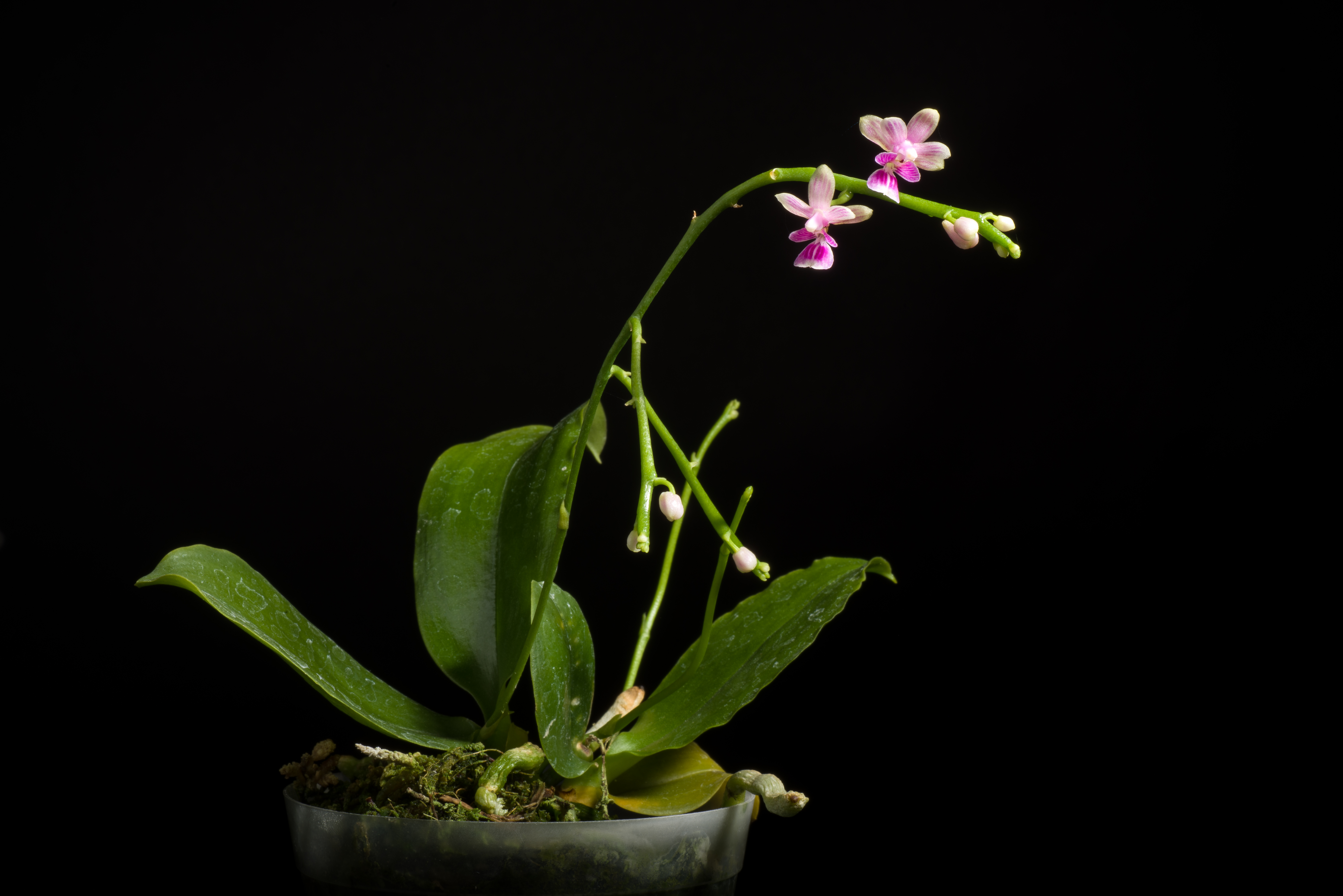
