= Sacred groves of India =

Forest fragments of varying sizes

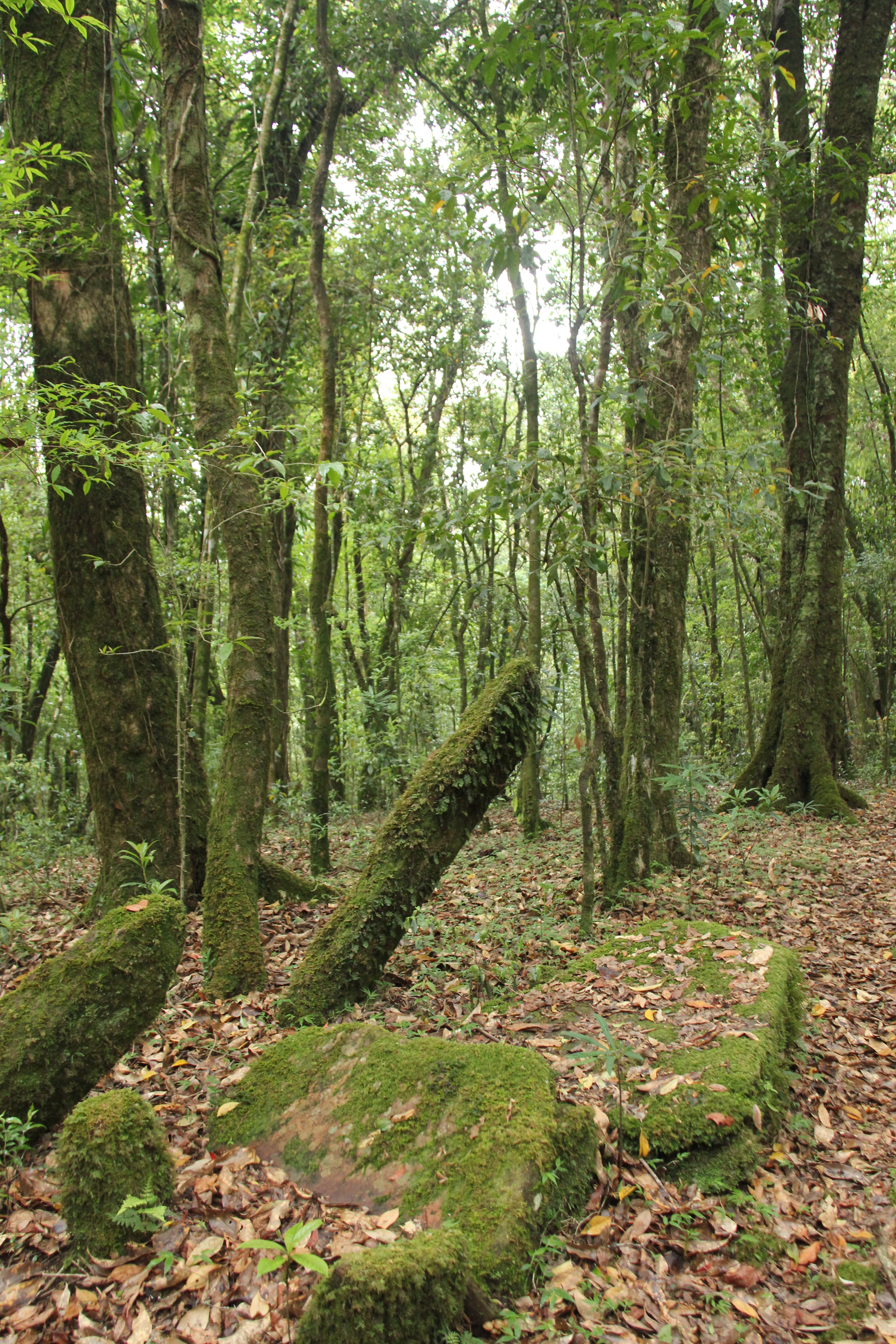
Ancient monoliths in Mawphlang sacred grove, India

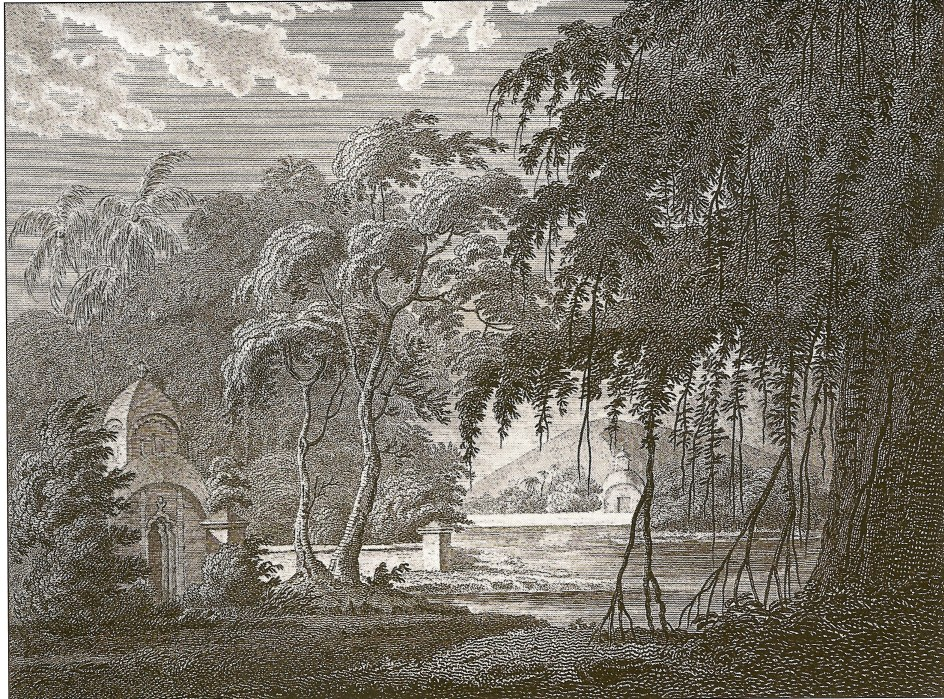
The Sacred Hindoo Grove near Chandod on the Banks of the Nerbudda by James Forbes, 1782

Sacred groves of India are forest groves which are communally protected and usually have a religious connotation. Hunting and logging are usually prohibited within these areas. Other forms of forest usage like honey collection and deadwood collection are sometimes allowed on a sustainable basis. NGOs work with local villagers to protect such groves. Traditionally, and in some cases even today, members of the community take turns to protect the grove. The introduction of the protected area category community reserves under the Wild Life (Protection) Amendment Act, 2002 has introduced legislation for providing government protection to community held lands, which could include sacred groves.

Around 14,000 sacred groves have been reported across India, which serve as protected spaces for rare fauna and flora amid rural and even urban settings. According to Malhotra (1998), the number of sacred groves in India is between 100,000 and 150,000. Threats to the groves include urbanization, fragmentation, encroachement, and over-exploitation of resources. While many of the groves are looked upon as abodes of Hindu deities, in the recent past a number of them have been partially cleared for construction of shrines and temples. Sacred groves are places of yatra (pilgrimage) in Indian-origin religions, such as Hinduism, Buddhism, Jainism and Sikhism.

Indian sacred groves are often associated with temples, monasteries, shrines, pilgrimage sites, or with burial grounds. Historically, sacred groves find their mention in Hindu, Jain and Buddhist texts, from sacred tree groves in Hinduism to sacred bamboo groves and sacred deer parks in Buddhism for example. Sacred groves may be loosely used to refer to natural habitat protected on religious grounds. Other historical references to sacred groves can be obtained in Vrukshayurveda an ancient treatise, ancient classics such as Kalidasa's Vikramuurvashiiya. There has been a growing interest in creating green patches such as Nakshatravana grove.

== Uses of sacred groves ==
=== Traditional uses ===
One of the most important traditional uses of sacred groves was that it acted as a repository for various Ayurvedic medicines. Other uses involved a source of replenishable resources like fruits and honey. In most sacred groves it was taboo to hunt or chop wood. The vegetation cover helps reduce soil erosion and prevents desertification as in Rajasthan. The groves are often associated with ponds and streams, and meet water requirements of local communities. They sometimes help in recharging aquifers.

=== Modern uses ===
In modern times, sacred groves have become biodiversity hotspots, as various species seek refuge in the areas due to progressive habitat destruction and hunting elsewhere. Sacred groves often contain plant and animal species that have become extinct in neighboring areas. They therefore harbor great genetic diversity. Besides this, sacred groves in urban landscapes act as "lungs" to the city as well, providing much needed vegetation cover.

== Religious beliefs and practices ==
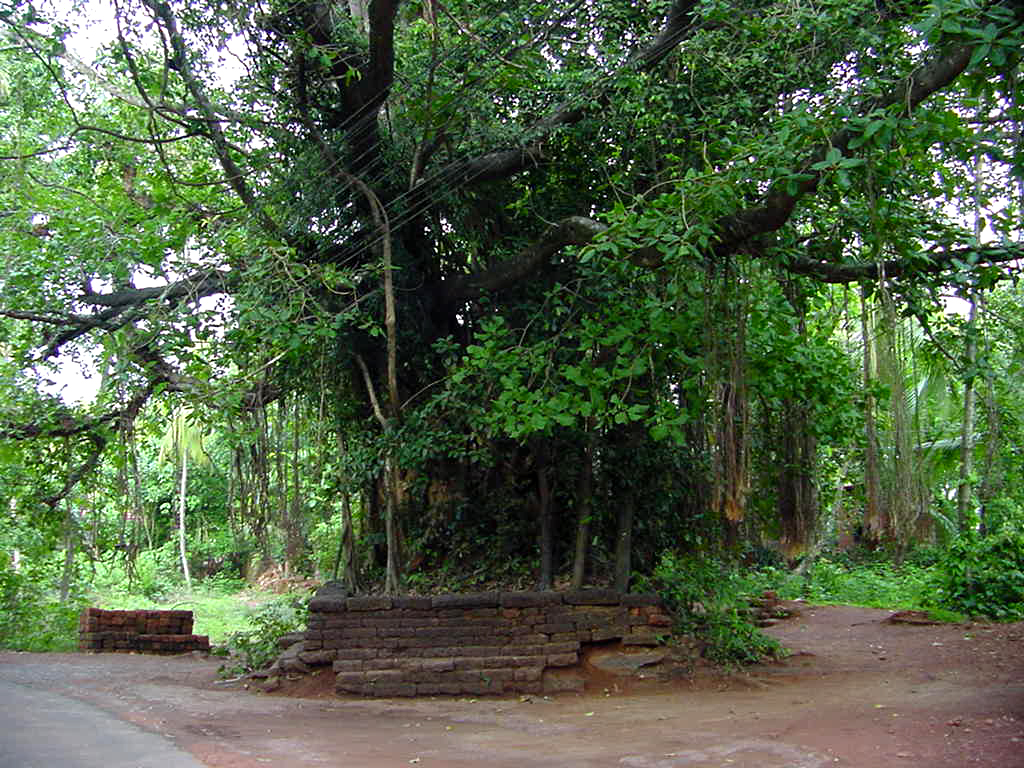
Banyan Tree at a temple in Kannur, India

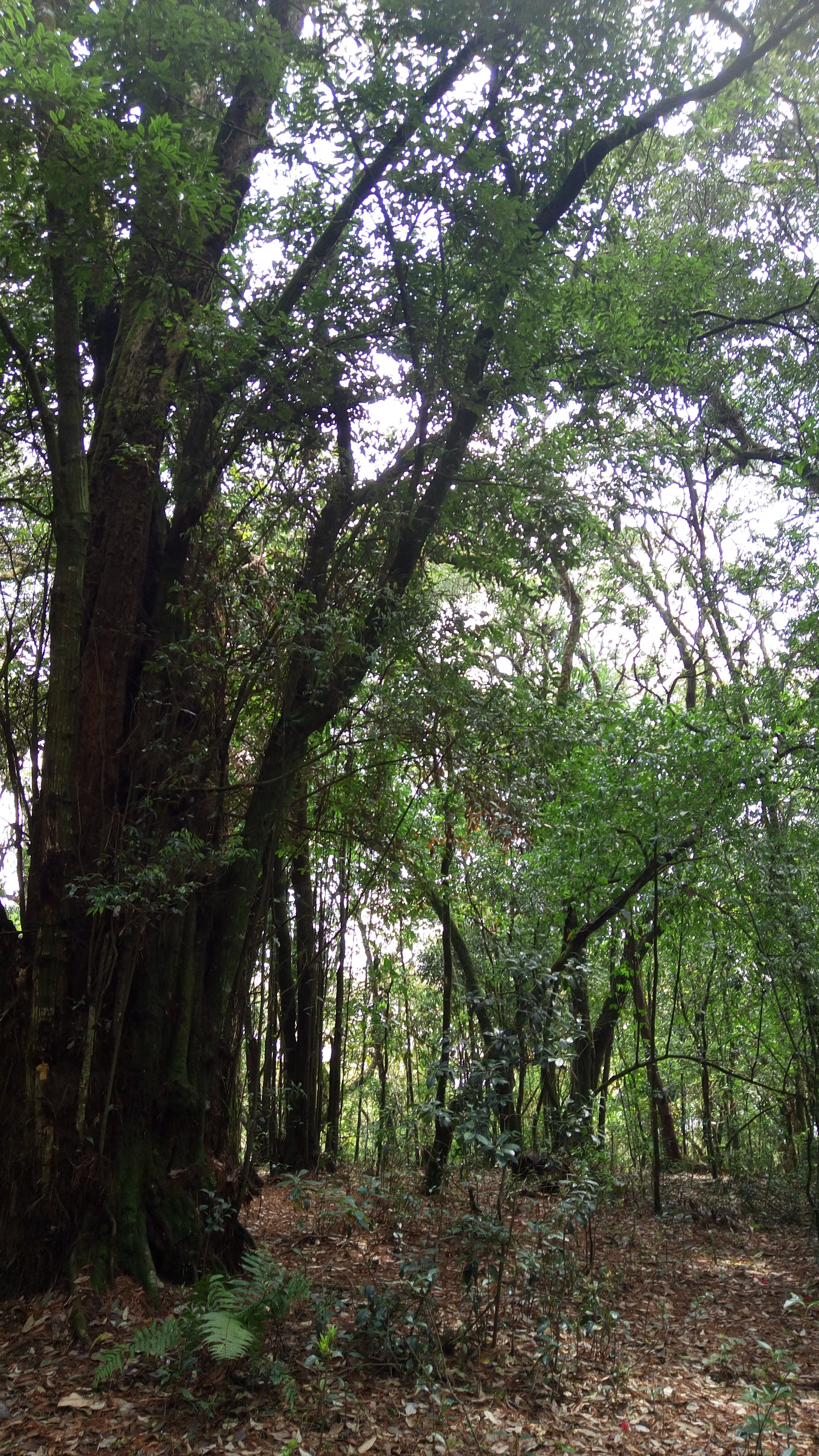
Sacred grove in Mawphlang, India

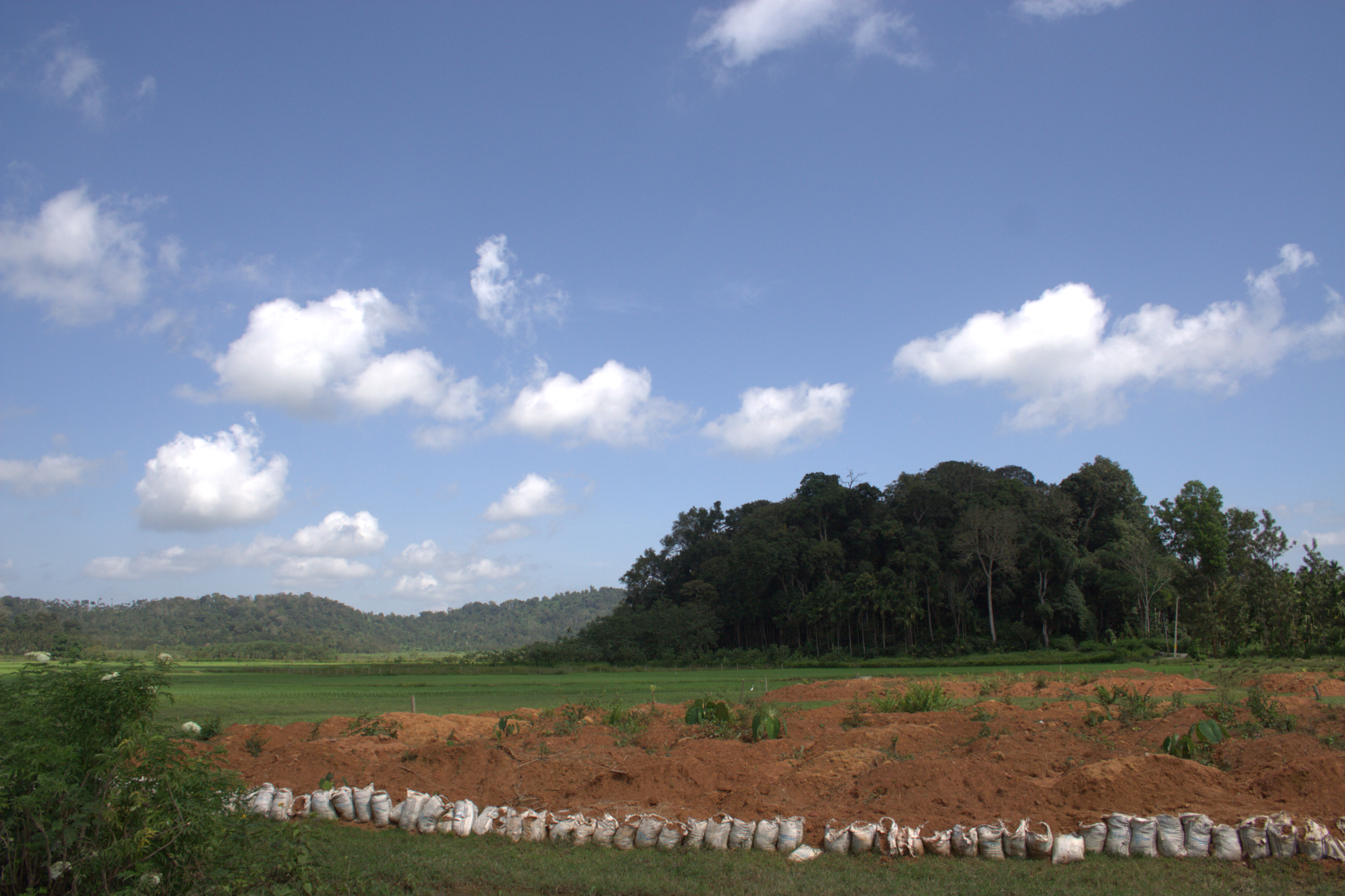
Sacred grove surrounded by paddy fields, India

Typically, sacred groves in Indian-origin religions are associated with the concept of a presiding deity. Often these sacred deities are numerous nature spirits and guardians associated with Hindu, Jain and Buddhist deities, such as nature spirits known as Yakshas (numerous nature spirits), Nāgas (serpent guardians) and guardian tutelary deities (like ayyanar and amman) are also known. There are over 1000 deities associated with sacred groves in the states of Kerala and Karnataka alone. A large number of distinct local art forms and folk traditions are associated with the deities of sacred groves, and are an important cultural aspect closely associated with sacred traditions. Ritualistic dances and dramatizations based on the local deities that protect the groves are called Theyyam in Kerala and Nagmandalam, among other names, in Karnataka. Often, elaborate rituals and traditions are associated with sacred groves, as are associated folk tales and folk mythology.

=== Types of sacred forests ===
The Hindu tradition considers forests to be of three types - Tapovan, Mahavan and Sreevan. Tapovan are forests associated with penance (Tapas), and are inhabited by saints and rishis. Mahavan refers to the grand natural forests. Tapovan and Mahavan are considered to be a Raksha ("sanctuary") for flora and fauna as ordinary human beings are not allowed to enter these forests. Sreevan, which means, "forests of the goddess of prosperity", consists of dense forests and groves. From the former, people would collect dry wood, leaves, forest produce and a limited amount of timber, though natural ecosystem would not be unnecessarily disturbed. Groves were considered as spaces of forests from where harvesting could be done. Sometimes, specific trees like mango trees could be planted and nurtured here. Groves were associated with religious rites, festivals and recreation. Typical recreational activities associated with these groves included jhoola/ jhoolan. In the villages, Panchavati, or a cluster of five trees that represented the forests, were maintained. These trees represented the five elements of Earth, Water, Fire, Air and Space.

=== Religious merits of planting and nurturing forests ===
Planting and nurturing of trees had been a highly evolved practice in ancient India. Vrukshayurveda, the science of plant life and also a 10th-century treatise of that title on the subject ascribed to Surapala, dealt with various species of trees and their growth. Verses 9-23 from this text indicate how mystical beliefs and conservation of ecology was inter-connected.

A person is honored in Vaikuntha for as many thousand years as the days they reside in a house where tulasi is grown.

And if one properly grows bilva, which pleases Lord Siva, in their family, the goddess of riches resides permanently passes on to the sons and grandsons

One who plants even a single asvattha, wherever it may be, as per the prescribed mode, goes to the abode of Hari.

One who has planted dhatri has performed several sacrifices. They have donated the earth. They would be considered a liberated soul forever.

One who plants a couple of banyan trees as per the prescribed mode would go to the abode of Siva.

After planting neem trees a person well-versed in dharma attains the abode of Sun. Indeed! One resides there for a long period.

By planting four plaksa trees a person doubtlessly obtains the fruits of Rajasuya sacrifice.

One who plants five or six mango trees attains the abode of Garuda and lives happily forever like gods.

One should plant seven palasa trees or even one. One attains the abode of Brahma and enjoys the company of gods by doing so.

One who personally plants eight udumbara trees or even prompts someone to plant them, rejoices in the lunar world

One who has planted madhuka has propitiated Parvati, has become free from diseases, and has worshipped all deities.

If one plants ksirini, dadimi, rambha, priyala, and panasa, one experiences no affliction for seven births.

One who has knowingly or unknowingly planted ambu is respected as a recluse even while staying in the house.

By planting all kinds of other trees, useful for fruits and flowers, a person gets a reward of thousand cows adorned with jewels.

By planting one asvattha, one picumanda, one nyagrodha, ten tamarind trees, the group of three, viz., kapittha, bilva, and amalaka, and five mango trees, one never visits hell.

== Locations of sacred groves ==
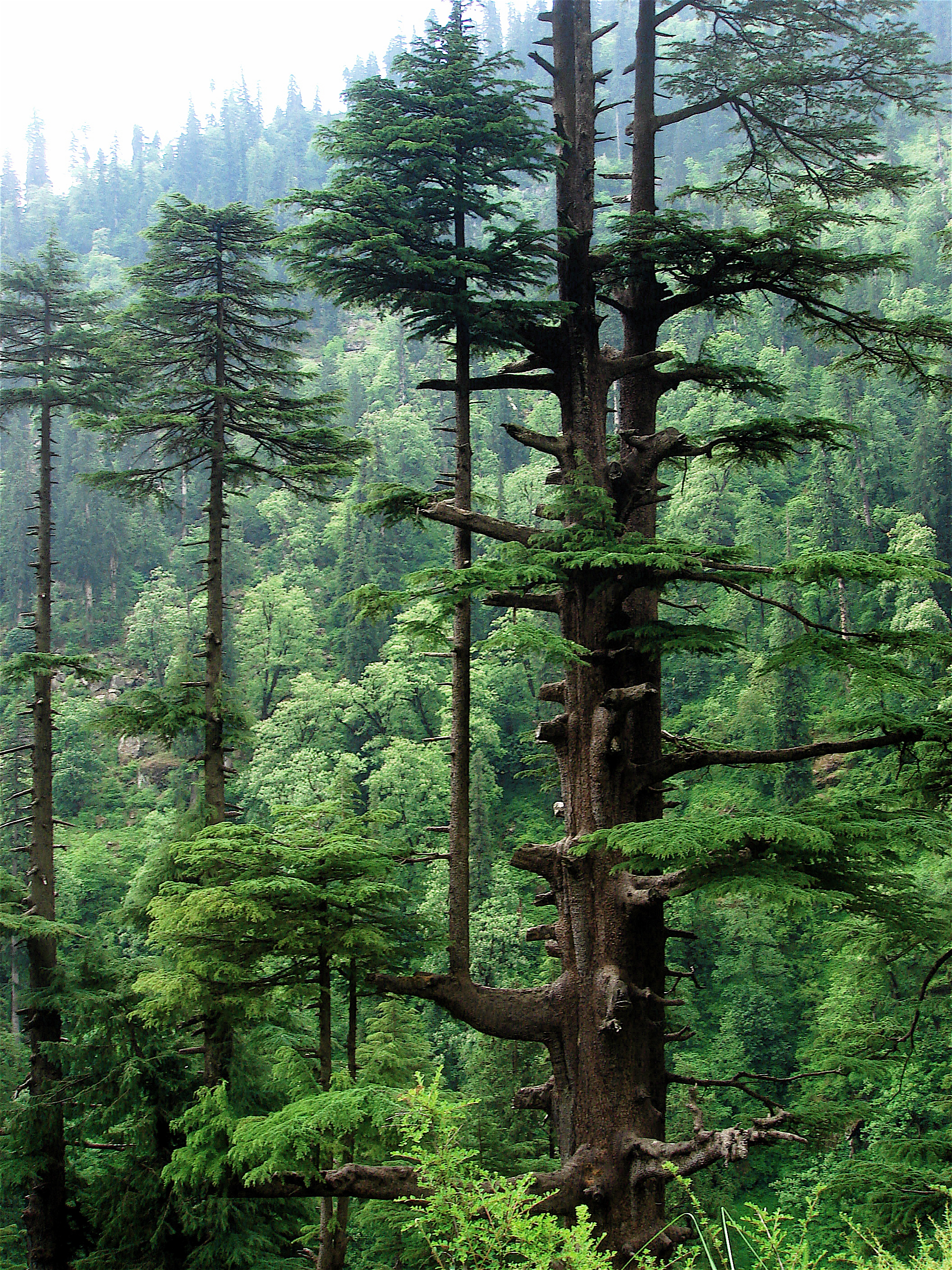
Deodar Devban grove in Himachal Pradesh, India

=== Distribution of sacred groves in India ===
Sacred groves are scattered all over the country, and are referred to by different names in different parts of India. Sacred groves occur in a variety of places – from scrub forests in the Thar Desert of Rajasthan maintained by the Bishnois, to rain forests in the Western Ghats of Kerala. Himachal Pradesh in the north and Kerala in the south are specifically known for their large numbers of sacred groves. The Gurjar people of Rajasthan have a unique practice of neem (Azadirachta indica) planting and worshipping as abode of God Devnarayan. Thus, a Gurjjar settlement appears like a human-inhabited sacred grove. Similarly Mangar Bani, last surviving natural forest of Delhi is protected by Gurjars of nearby area. 14,000 sacred groves have been reported from all over India, which act as reservoirs of rare fauna, and more often rare flora, amid rural and even urban settings. Experts believe that the total number of sacred groves could be as high as 100,000.

It is estimated that around 1000 km^{2} of unexploited land is inside sacred groves. Some of the more famous groves are the kavus of Kerala, which are located in the Western Ghats and have enormous biodiversity; and the law kyntangs of Meghalaya – sacred groves associated with every village (two large groves being in Mawphlang and Mausmai) to appease the forest spirit.

=== Summary of number of sacred groves by states in India ===
Among the largest sacred groves of India are the ones in Hariyali (5.5 km²), near Gauchar in Chamoli District of Uttarakhand, and the Deodar grove in Shipin near Simla in Himachal Pradesh. Seeing the importance of sacred groves and other sacred natural sites in having conserved biodiversity all across the Himalayas, the intergovernmental organization ICIMOD developed and published a framework in 2016, to assess the present day significance of such sites for their integration into formal conservation and development frameworks.

All numbers are quoted from the records of the C.P.R. Environmental Education Centre of the Government of India. Starred numbers are likely to increase. The centre also maintains a complete list of identified sacred groves in India, most of which is online.

State	No of groves	Local name	References
Andhra Pradesh	691	Pavitraskhetralu	Kailash C. Malhotra et al.
Arunachal Pradesh	65	Gumpa forests (since attached to monasteries)	Dudley et al.
Assam	40	Than, Madaico	
Chhattisgarh	600*	Sarna, Devlas, Mandar, Budhadev	
Goa	0*		SERBC document
Gujarat	42*		
Haryana	248	Beed or Bid (बीड़), Bani (बणी), Bann (बण), Janglat (जंगलात), Shamlat (शामलात)	
Himachal Pradesh	329	Dev Kothi, Devban, Bakhu Devban	
Jharkhand	21*	Sarna more than 500 " Jaherthan" in Godda of Jharkhand	Marine Carrin
Karnataka	1424	Devarakadu, Devkad	Gadgil et al.
Kerala	2000	Kavu, Sarpa Kavu	M. Jayarajan
Maharashtra	2820	Deorai/Devrai (west), Devgudi (east) (Pune, Ratnagiri, Raigarh, Kolhapur; Sindhudurg, Ahmednagar, Thane districts)	Waghchaure et al. Envis
Manipur	365	Umang Lai, Gamkhap, Mauhak (sacred bamboo reserves)	Khumbongmayum et al.
Meghalaya	79	Law Kyntang (sacred sacrificial forest), Ki Law Niam (religious forest), Law Lyngdoh (sacred forest under religious leaders)	Upadhyay et al.
Orissa	322*	Jahera, Thakuramma	
Puducherry	108	Kovil Kadu	Ramanujam et al.
Punjab	9*	Jhidi	Singh et al.
Rajasthan	9*	Oran (Jaiselmer, Jodhpur, Bikaner), Kenkri (Ajmer), Vani (Mewar), Shamlat deh, Devbani (Alwar), Jogmaya	
Sikkim	56	Gumpa forests (since attached to monasteries)	S. S. Dash Dudley et al.
Tamil Nadu	1400	Kovil Kadu	Eliza Kent TNBB document
Telangana	65		Kailash C. Malhotra et al.
Uttarakhand	18*	Devbhumi, Baun, Bugyal (sacred alpine meadows)	Anthwal et al.
West Bengal	670*	Garamthan, Harithan, Jahera, Sabitrithan, Santalburithan	R. K. Bhakat

=== Select examples of sacred groves ===
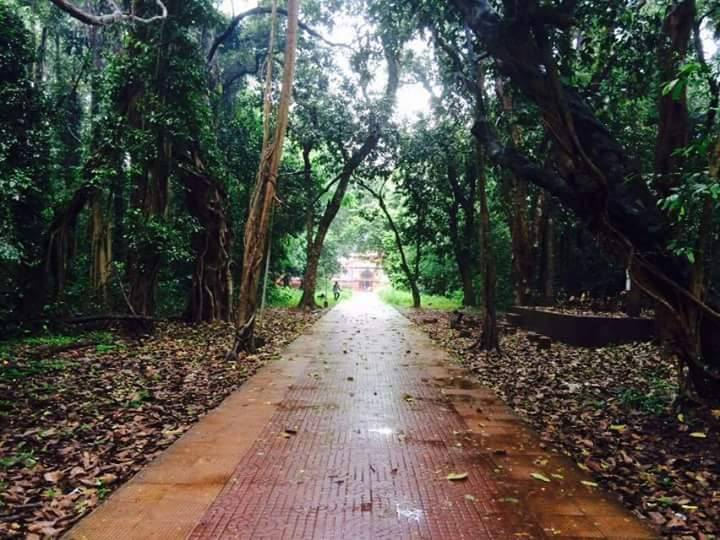
Mannan Purath Kavu, Nileshwaram

- Sarpa Kavu: A Sarpakkavu or Snake Grove is a kind of holy grove found in Kerala. Kavu is the traditional name given for Sacred groves across the Malabar Coast in Kerala, South India. Kavus are notable for Theyyam, the centuries-old ritual dance.
- Umang Lai (literally, "Forest Deities"): A form of holy Sacred grove found in Manipur. There are more than 365 Umang Lais, affiliated to the ancient religion of Sanamahism, which exists in various regions scattered across the Northeastern state of Manipur since ancient times. The holy as well as religious festival of Lai Haraoba is celebrated especially in regards of these holy sacred groves. The accounts of these holy sacred groves are found in the ancient Manipuri Manuscript named Karthong Lamlen. Interestingly, Manipur ranks 8th among all the Indian States and 1st in North East India, for having highest number of sacred groves across the country.

== Threats ==
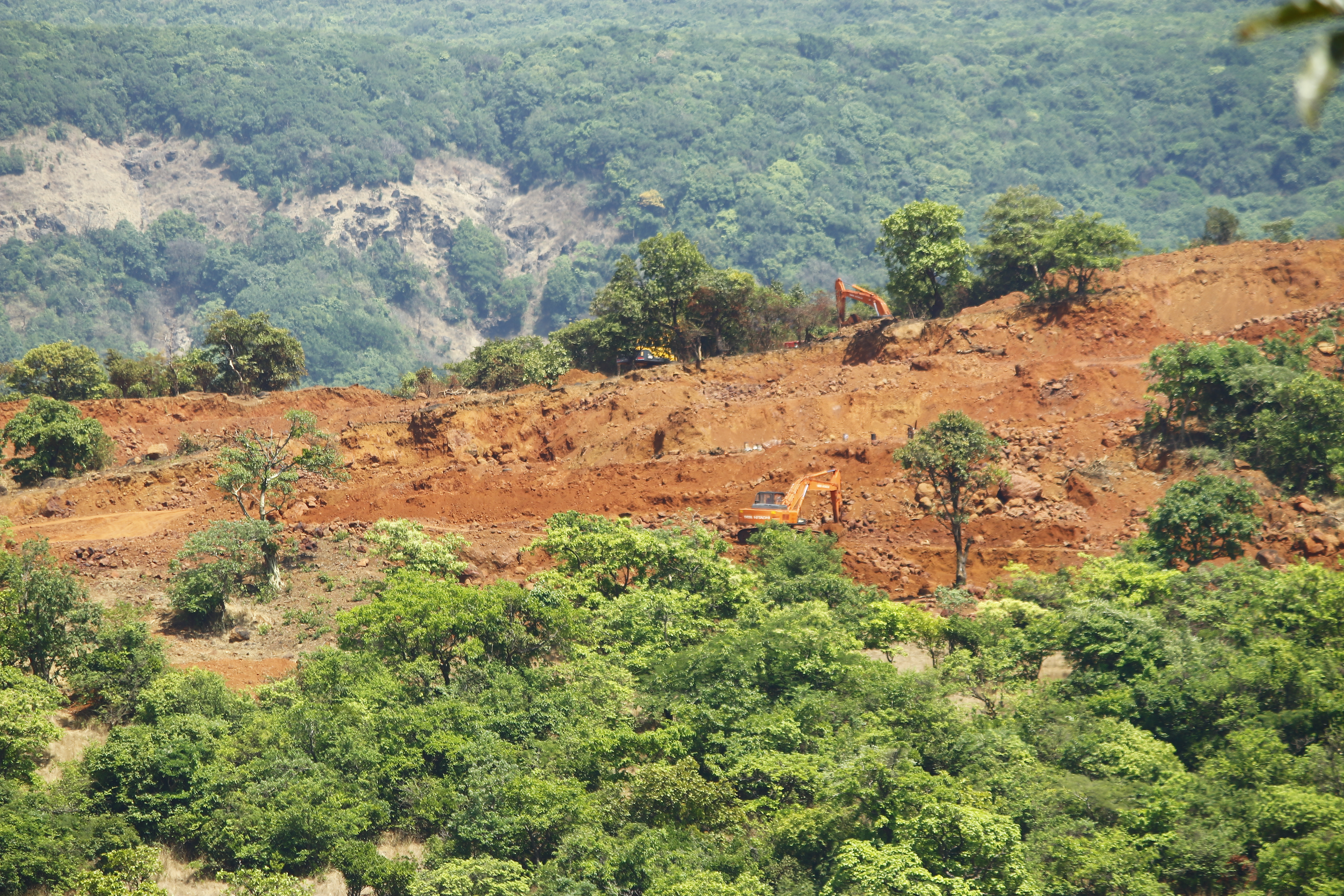
Threats – mining projects

Threats to the grove include urbanization, over-exploitation of resources (like overgrazing and excessive firewood collection), and environmental destruction due to religious practices. Other threats to the sacred groves include invasion by invasive species, like the invasive weeds Chromolaena odorata, Lantana camara and Prosopis juliflora.

== See also ==
- India related
  - Bodhi Tree
  - Environment of India
  - List of Banyan trees in India
- Sacred related
  - Sacred groves
  - Sacred mountains
  - Sacred natural site
  - Sacred rivers
  - Sacred site
  - Sacred trees
  - Tree hugger (disambiguation)
  - Tree worship
- General
  - List of types of formally designated forests
  - Superlative trees
