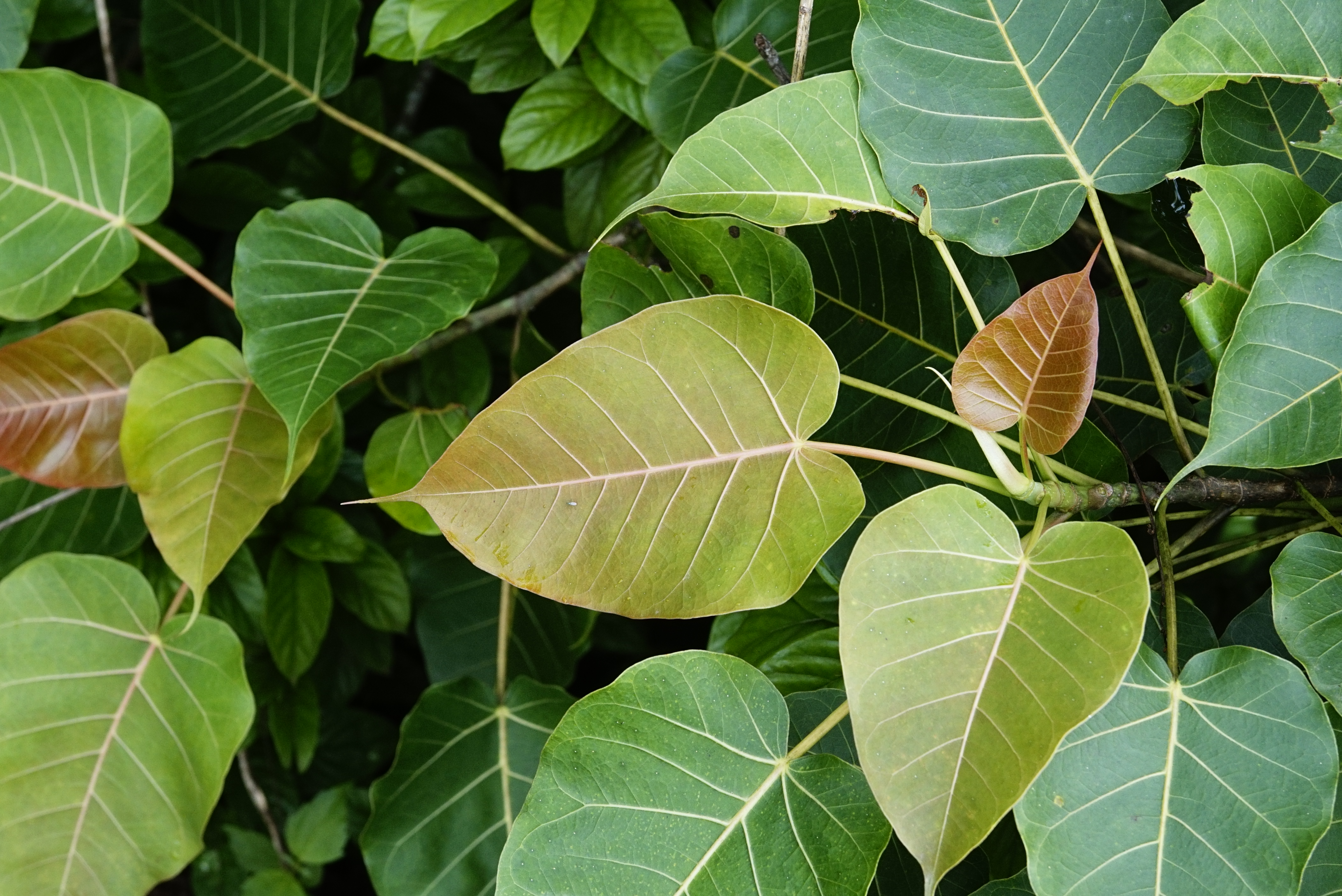

Conservation status
- Least Concern (IUCN 3.1)

Scientific classification
- Kingdom: Plantae
- Clade: Tracheophytes
- Clade: Angiosperms
- Clade: Eudicots
- Clade: Rosids
- Order: Rosales
- Family: Moraceae
- Genus: Ficus
- Species: F. arnottiana

Binomial name
- Ficus arnottiana (Miq.) Miq.

Synonyms
- Ficus arnottiana var. courtallensis (Miq.) Miq.; Ficus arnottiana var. subcostata Corner; Ficus populeaster Desf.; Urostigma arnottianum Miq.; Urostigma cordifolium Dalzell & A.Gibson, nom. illeg. homonym. post.; Urostigma courtallense Miq.

= Ficus arnottiana =

Species of flowering plant

Ficus arnottiana, commonly known as the Indian rock fig, rock peepal or wavy-leaved fig tree, is a species of fig tree, native to the Indian subcontinent with a preference to rocky habitats. The species was named in honor of the Scottish botanist George Arnott Walker-Arnott.

== Description ==
Ficus arnottiana is a medium to large deciduous tree that can grow up to 20 meters (66 feet) in height. The tree has a spreading canopy, and its bark is smooth and grayish-white. The leaves are large, ovate to heart-shaped, and have a distinctive glossy green surface with prominent veins. Unlike Ficus religiosa (a species that it is commonly mistaken for), its leaves have a more pointed and acuminate rather than a long tapering one.

The tree produces small, round figs that are initially green and turn reddish when ripe. These figs grow in pairs along the branches and serve as a crucial food source for birds, bats, and other wildlife. Like other Ficus species, F. arnottiana has a mutualistic relationship with fig wasps, which pollinate its flowers.

== Habitat and distribution ==
This species is native to the Indian subcontinent, including India, Nepal, Sri Lanka, and the Western Himalayas, and to the Andaman Islands and Thailand. It grows in dry deciduous forests, on rocky slopes, and near riverbanks observed mostly in clay to a well drained soil with quite some water and lots of sun. It is well adapted to arid conditions and can often be seen growing on cliffs and large boulders.

== Gallery ==
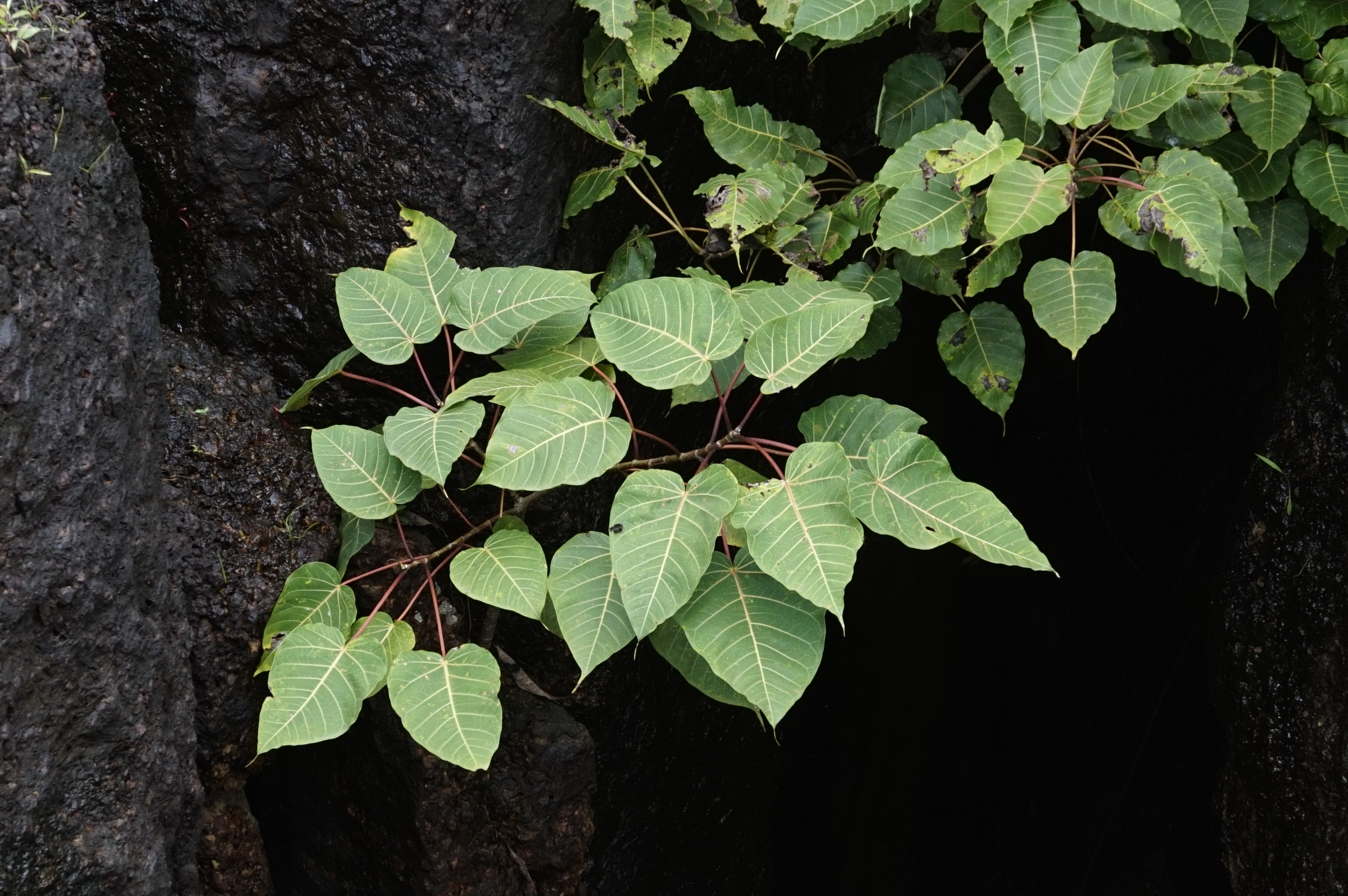
Ficus arnottiana seen growing in rock fissures

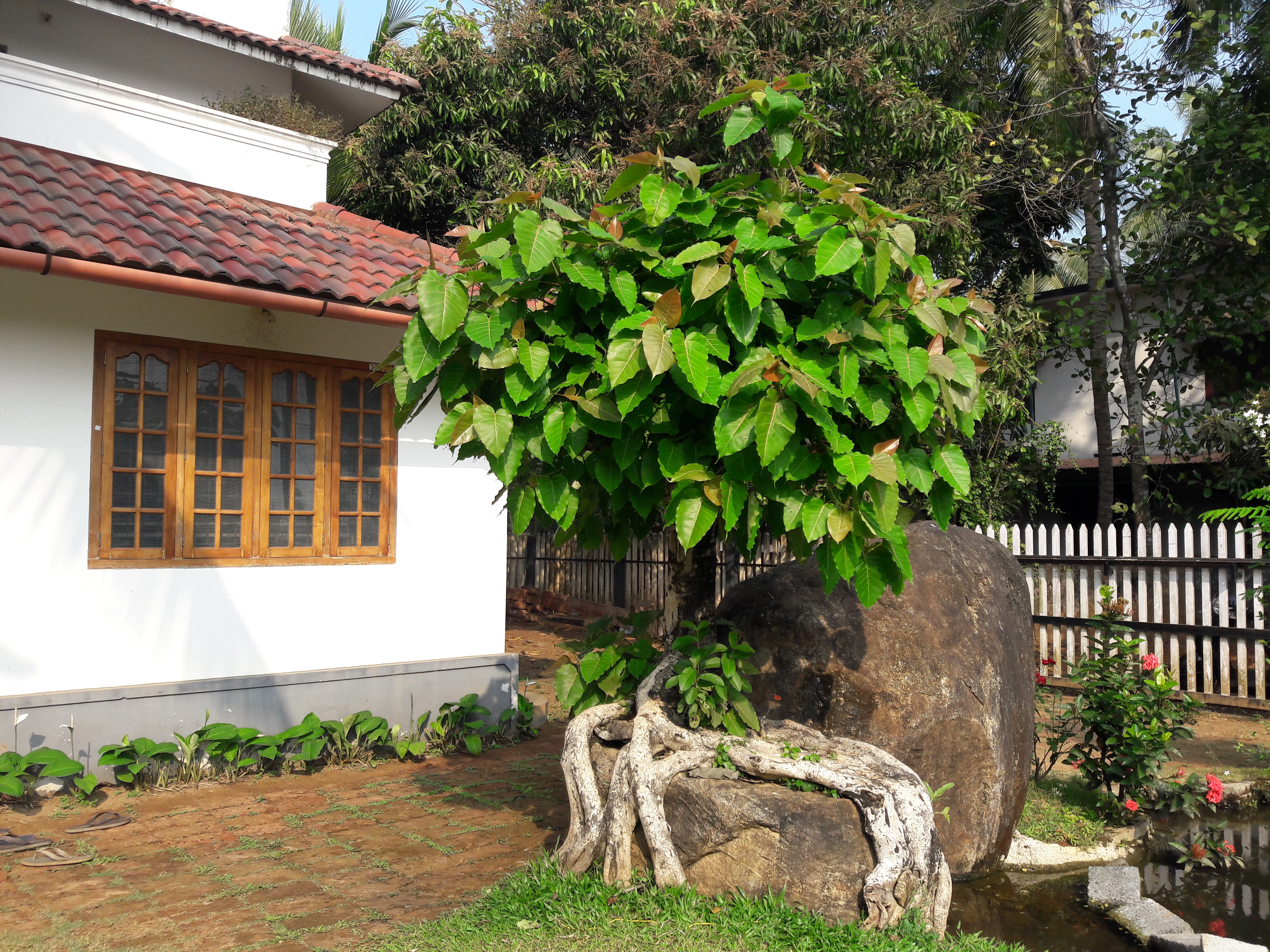
Ficus arnottiana can be see taking root on a rock

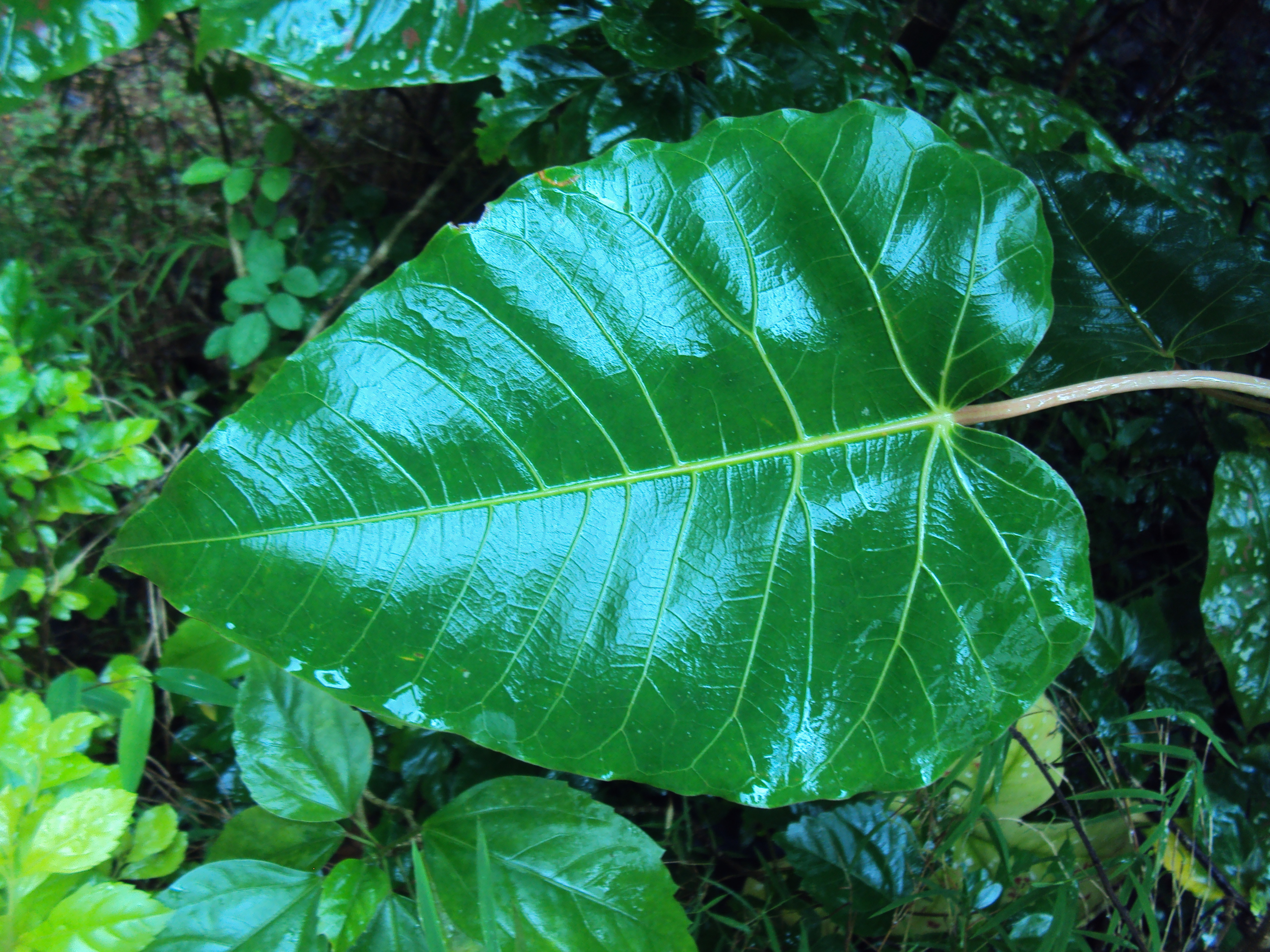
Ficus arnottiana with leaves ovate to heart-shaped, with a smooth, glossy green surface with slightly pointed apex.

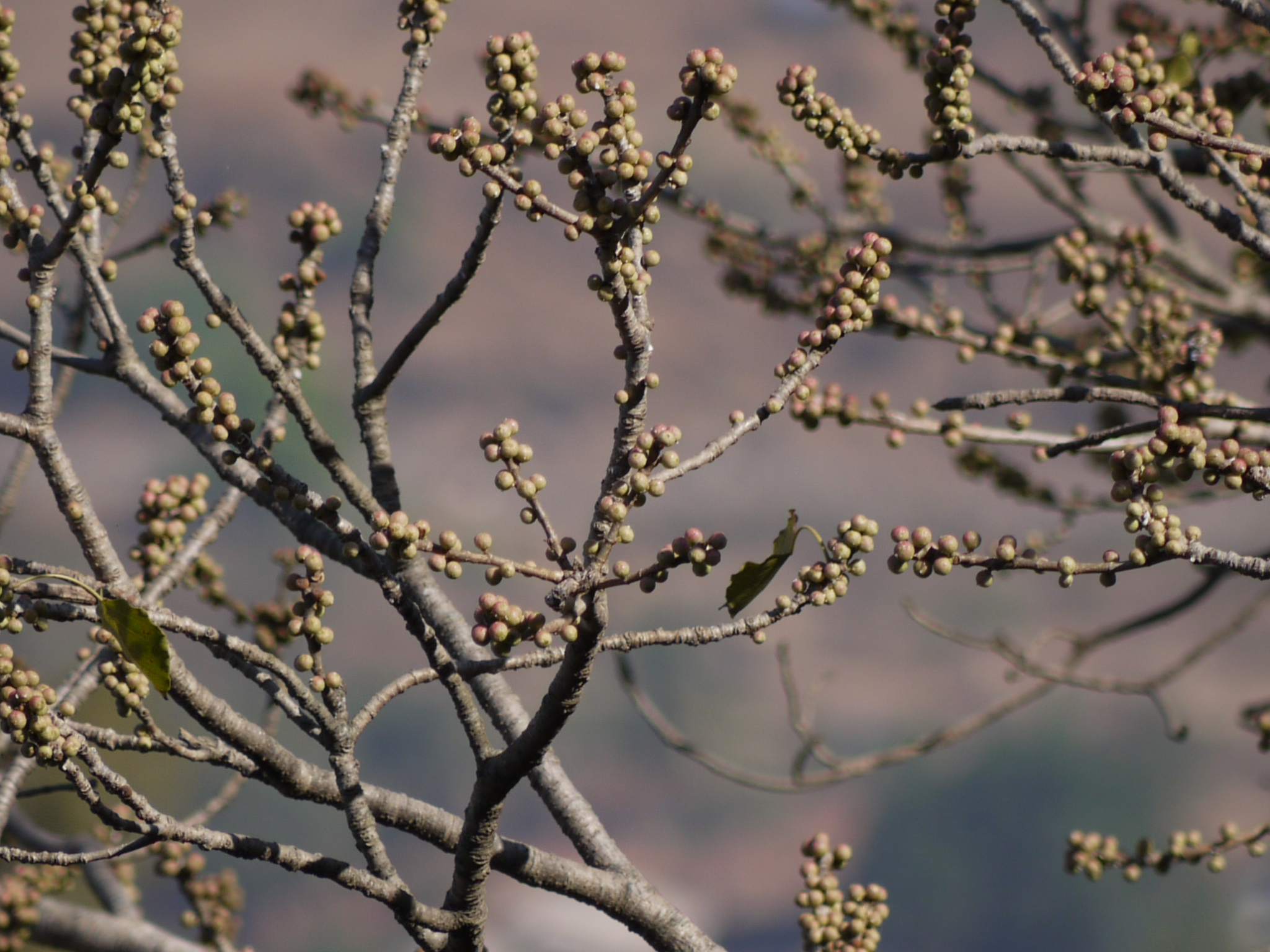
Ficus arnottiana fruits growing in pairs along the branches

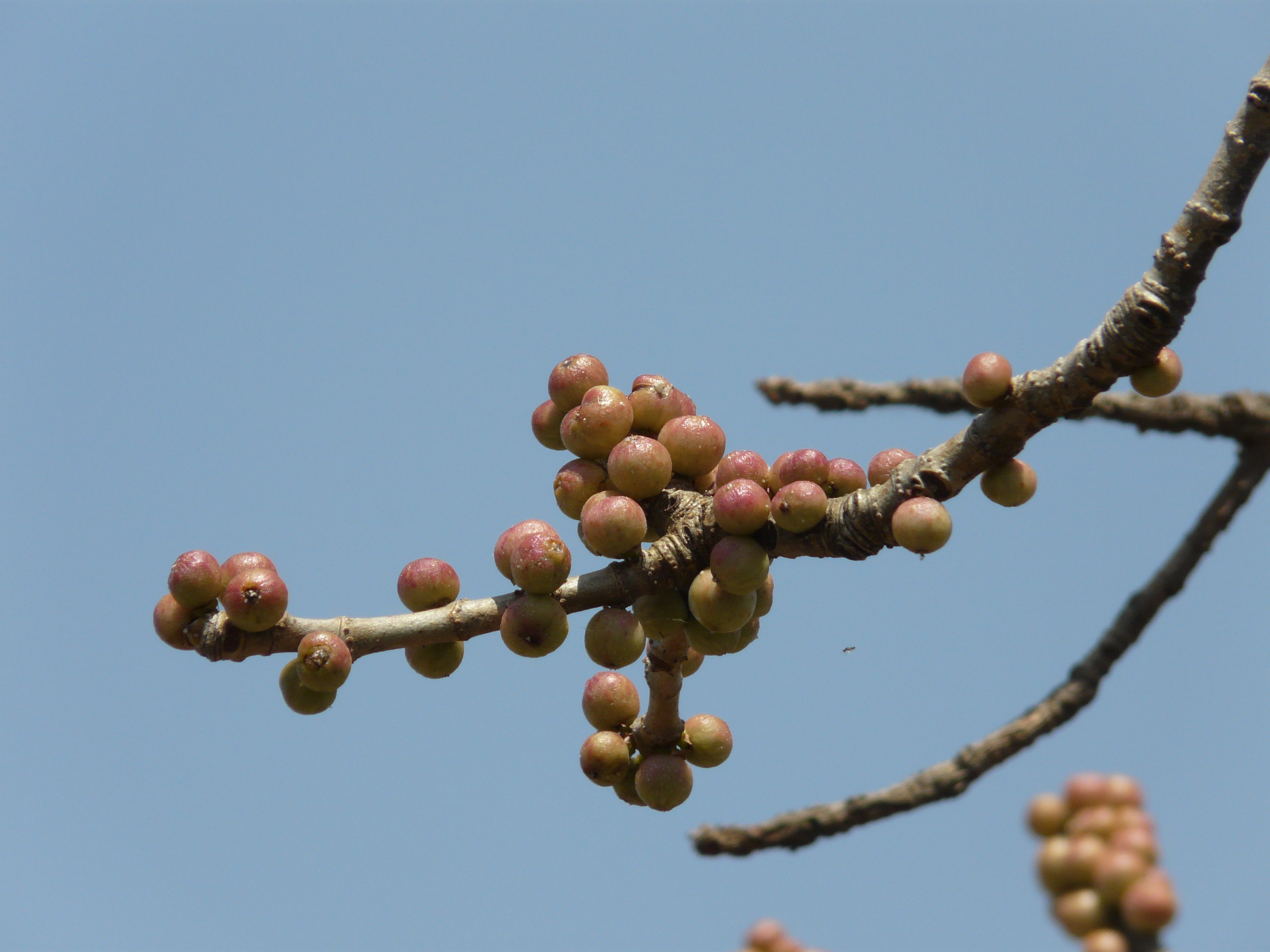
Riping fruits of Ficus arnottiana

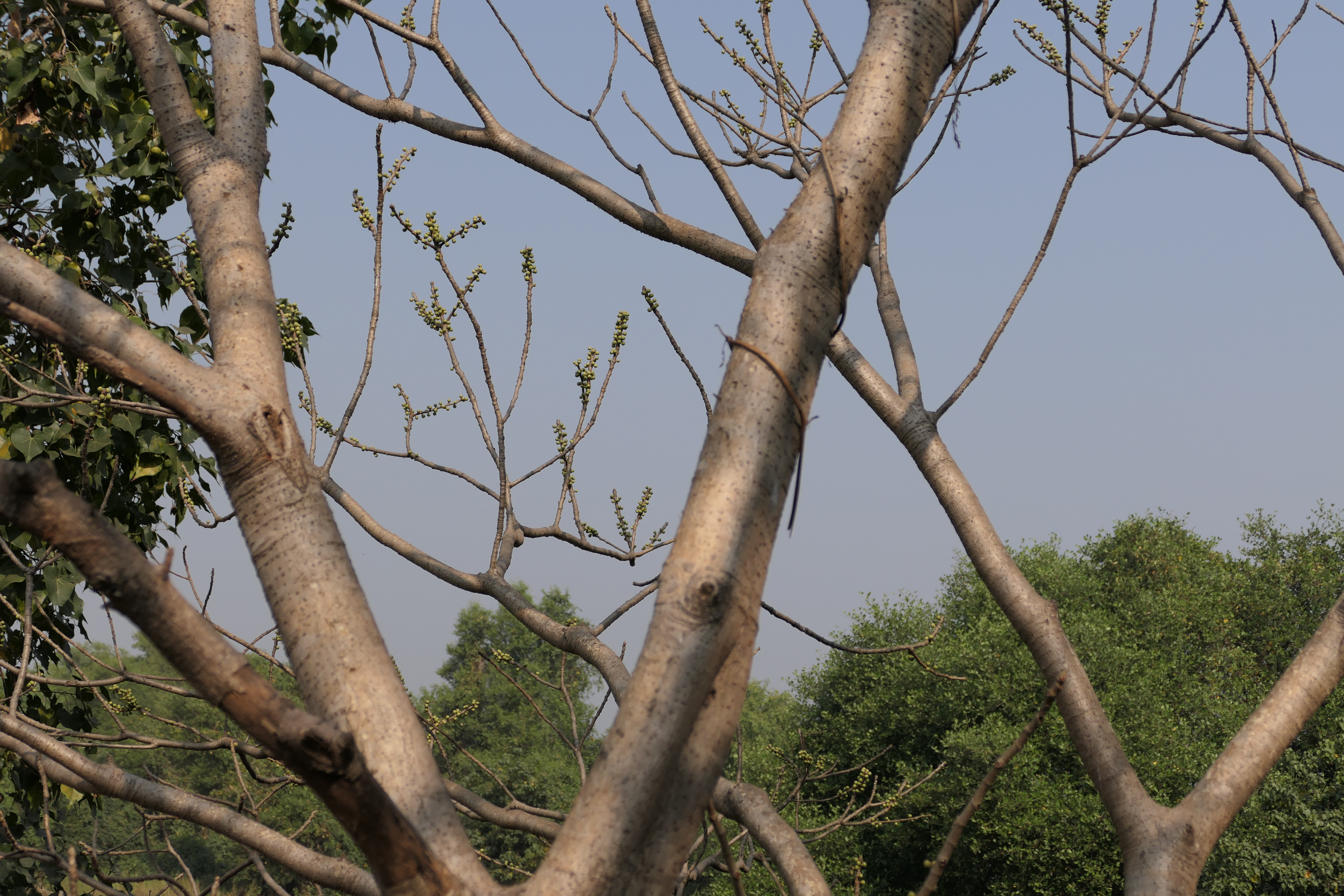
Grayish-white and smooth bark on a Ficus arnottiana tree

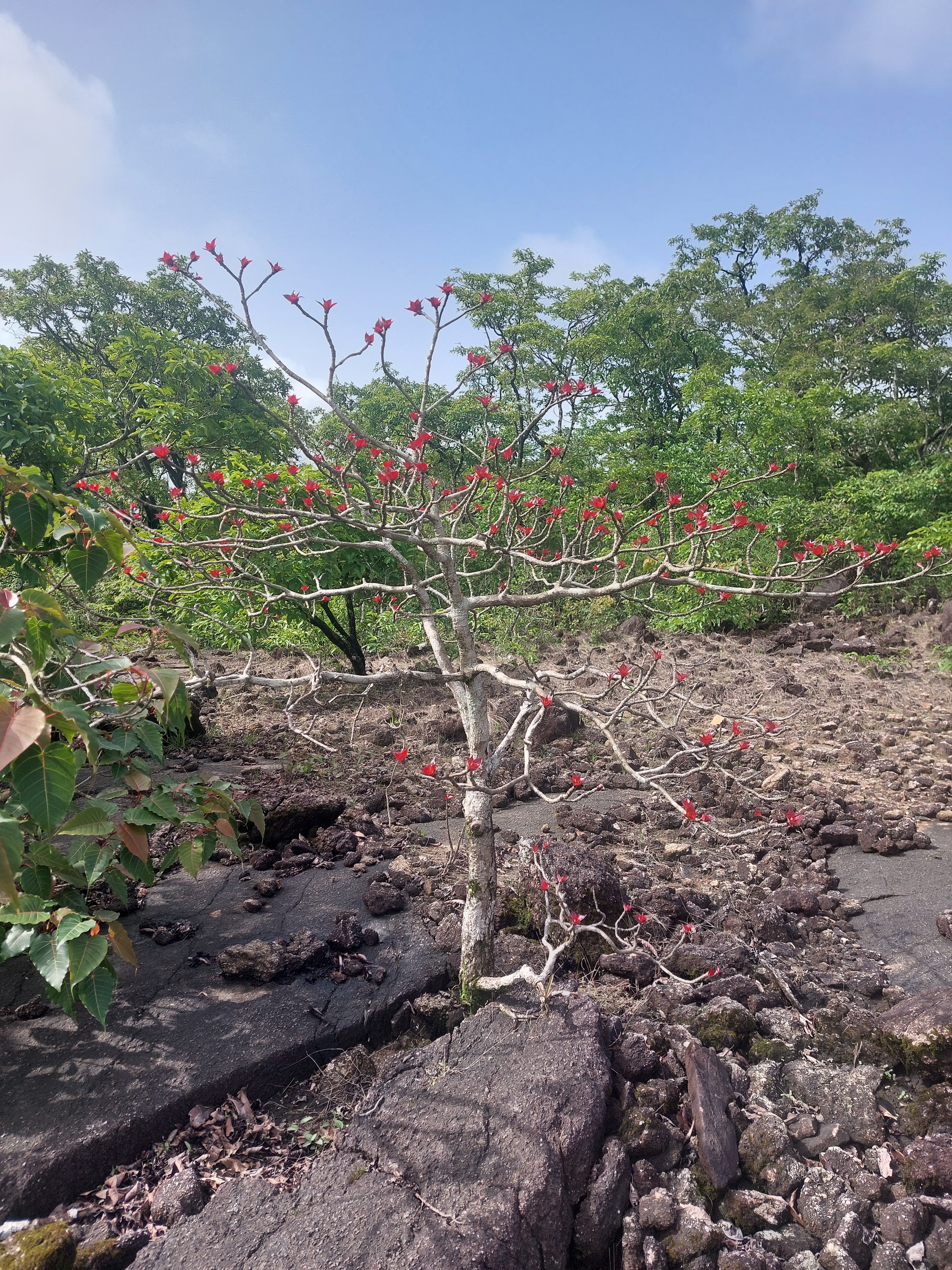
Ficus arnottiana on a rocky surface. Red leaved is young and green is an older specimen.
