= Minyma Kutjara Arts Project =

Community-based art centre

Minyma Kutjara Arts Project formerly Irrunytju Arts, is an Aboriginal Australian art centre based in the community of Irrunytju (Wingellina), Western Australia.

== History ==
In the 1960s, Yarnangu people returned to their country at Irrunytju from the missions, where they had been sent by the government. In 1975 Irrunytju Community was established.

The original arts centre, Irrunytju Arts, opened in 2000 or 2001, and proved a huge success, both in Australia and internationally. Star artist Yannima Tommy Watson's work was permanently exhibited at the Musee du Quai Branly. Mary Knights managed the centre for some time. However, the top artists were exploited by unethical art dealers, and the centre was forced to close in 2007.

In 2012 the centre was reopened as Minyma Kutjara Arts Project, and in 2015 had some of its work exhibited as part of the Tarnanthi festival at the South Australian School of Art.

In 2020 funding was provided for Minyma Kutjara Arts Project to refurbish the original painting shed, buy more art materials, and employ a full-time manager.

== Description and location ==
Minyma Kutjara Arts Project is a nonprofit community art centre which represents artists from Irrunytju. Irrunytju is a remote community situated near the tri-state border of the Northern Territory, Western Australia, and South Australia, approximately 720 km (450 mi) south-west of Alice Springs.

The landscape is arid, dry and very remote. The Irrunytju artists and their families will often travel through the country of their ancestors to hunt for food, collect plants for bush medicine, and grass and seeds for basket weaving and jewellery making. With much of the artworks drawing on ancient Tjukurrpa ("Dreaming" stories), the enterprise supports a variety of arts and crafts, including painting, metal sculpture, punu (wood carving), tjanpi (grass) weaving, as well as producing bush medicine.

The name derives from the story of the Minyma Kutjara (Two Women), a significant tjukurpa. The sisters travelled from South Australia through the Central Desert to Kaltukatjara (Docker River) in the Northern Territory.

== Artists ==
The artists belong to the Pitjantjatjara language and cultural group.

The art centre has supported many artists, including Anmanari Brown, Patju Presley, Ngiyu Watson, Nyakul Dawson, Tjuruparu Geoffrey Watson, Wingu Tingima, Alkawari Dawson, Patju Presley and Yannima Tommy Watson (who now works independently), as well as Jorna Newberry, Kuntjil Cooper, Karrika Belle Davidson, Ivy Laidlaw, Tjayanka Woods, Myra Cook, Anmanari Brown, Angampa Martin, and Roma Butler.
