= Kleczanów =

- Village
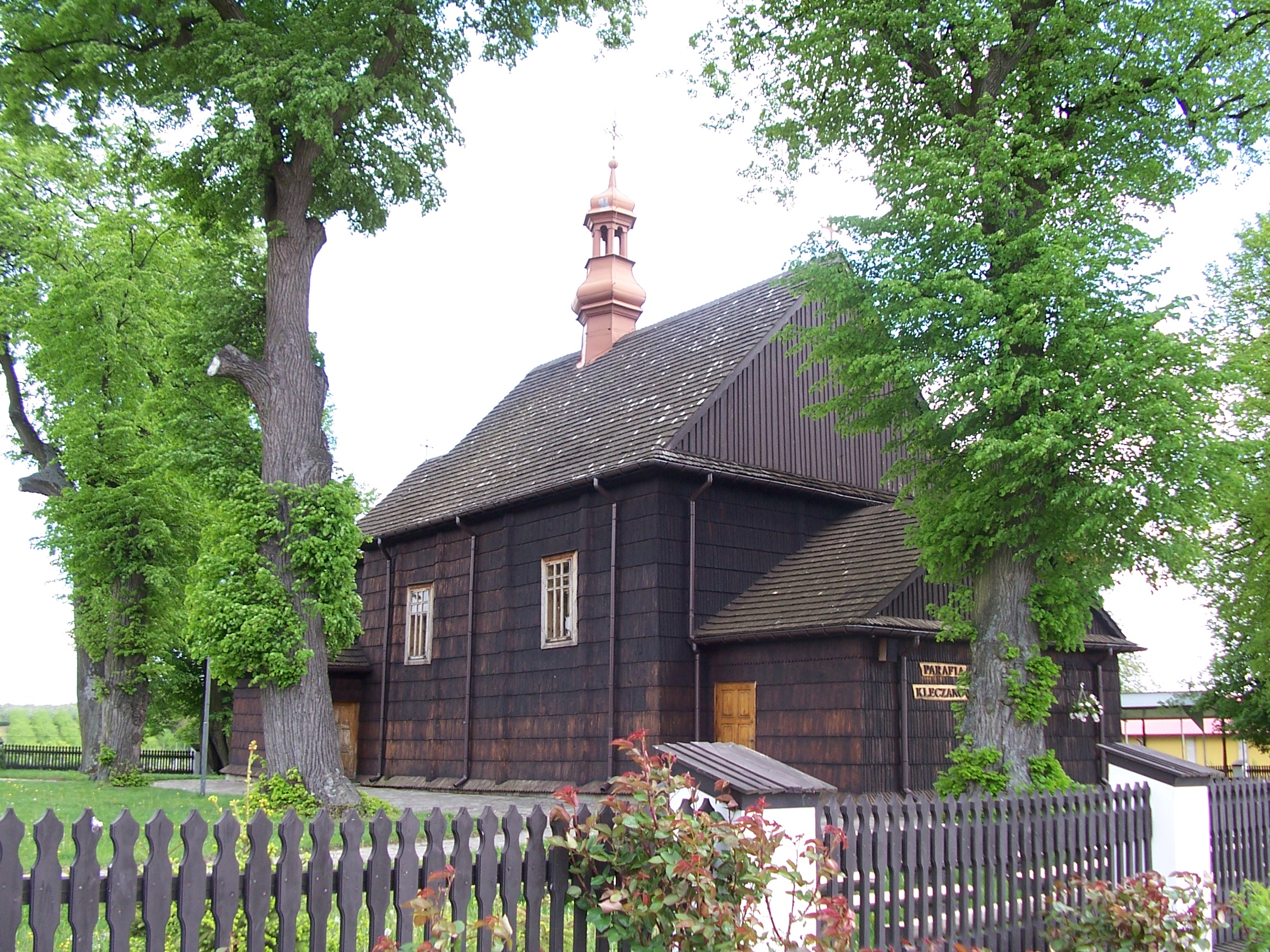
- Wooden church

- Location within Poland
- Coordinates: 50°42′56″N 21°34′2″E
- Country: Poland
- Voivodeship: Świętokrzyskie
- County: Sandomierz
- Gmina: Obrazów
- Population (2006): 570
- Post Code: 27-641
- Area code: (+48) 15
- Vehicle registration: TSA
- Website: www.kleczanow.pl

Kleczanów [klɛˈt͡ʂanuf] is a village in the administrative district of Gmina Obrazów, within Sandomierz County, Świętokrzyskie Voivodeship, in south-central Poland. It lies approximately 6 km (4 mi) north-west of Obrazów, 14 km (9 mi) west of Sandomierz, and 70 km (43 mi) east of the regional capital Kielce.

== History ==
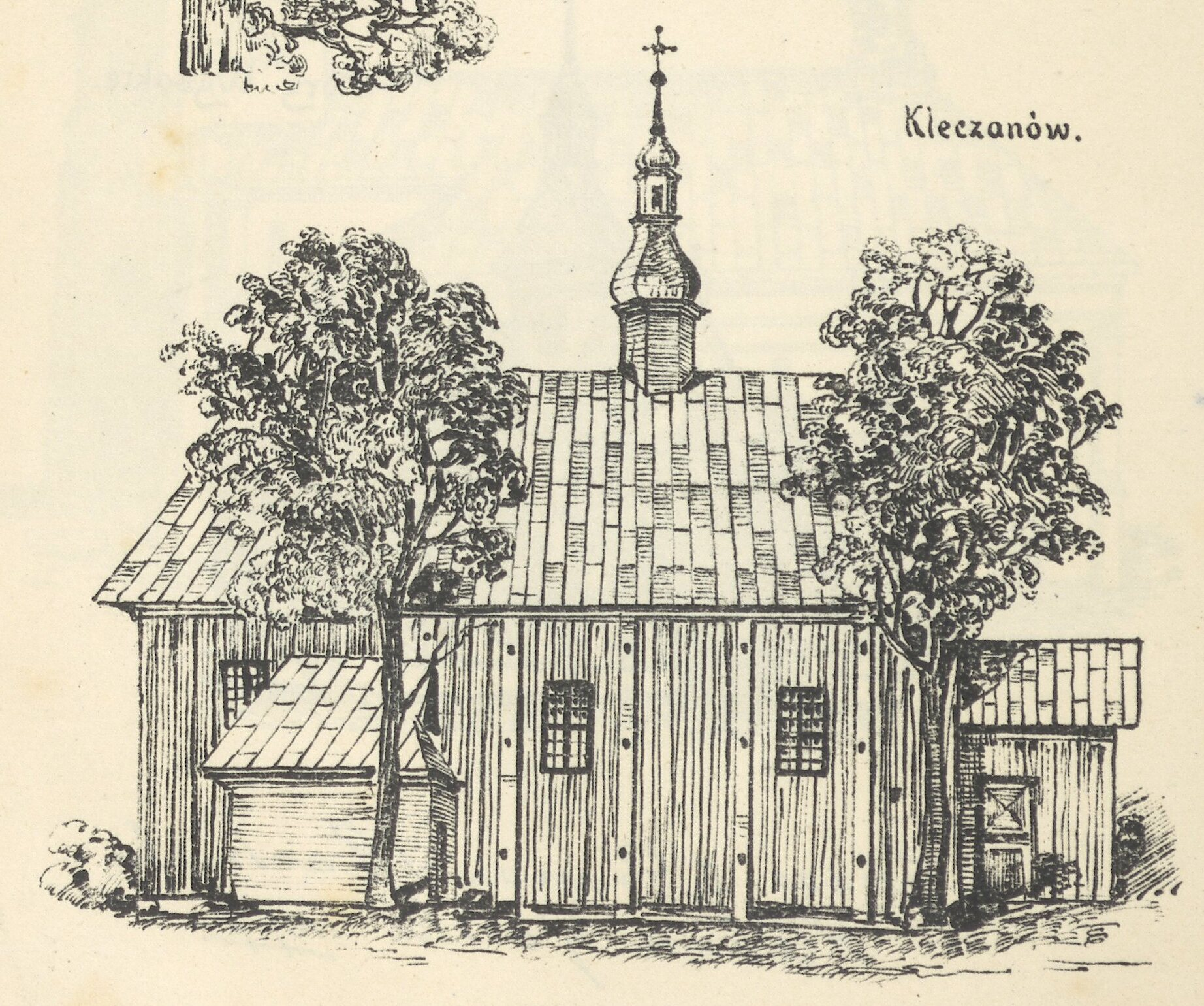
Church in Kleczanów before 1915

Nearby Kleczanów Forest (Polish: Las w Kleczanowie) features ancient burial grounds from the 8th–10th century. The small forest complex (c. 5 ha) iis known for featuring an ancient site of 37 Slavic kurgans (burial mounds) 4–10 metres high. The complex is surrounded by agricultural fields, and is unique in the whole region. The first burials are believed to have started in the Kleczanów woods in the late Stone Age and continued into the 10th and 11th centuries. The prehistoric cemetery was discovered by Polish archeologists in the 1990s. In pagan times the site could have been a Slavic sacred wood (gaj, Proto-Slavic *gajь 'wood, thicket, bush, grove', see: Slavic mythology, sacred grove), a place where people worshipped and used to bury their relatives. Although the whole surrounding landscape was transformed into farmland, the Kleczanów Woods survived untouched. For 1,000 years the religious community of Kleczanów used to celebrate Pentecost feasts and Whitsun festival there. The spring season, lasting from March till June, was traditionally devoted by Slavs to rebirth ceremonies and communication with dead ancestors (as well as autumn time, conf. Halloween among Germanic people). In early Christian period this pagan habit blended with Catholic feasts.

During World War II, Germans executed several dozens of Polish partisans in the vicinity of the village.

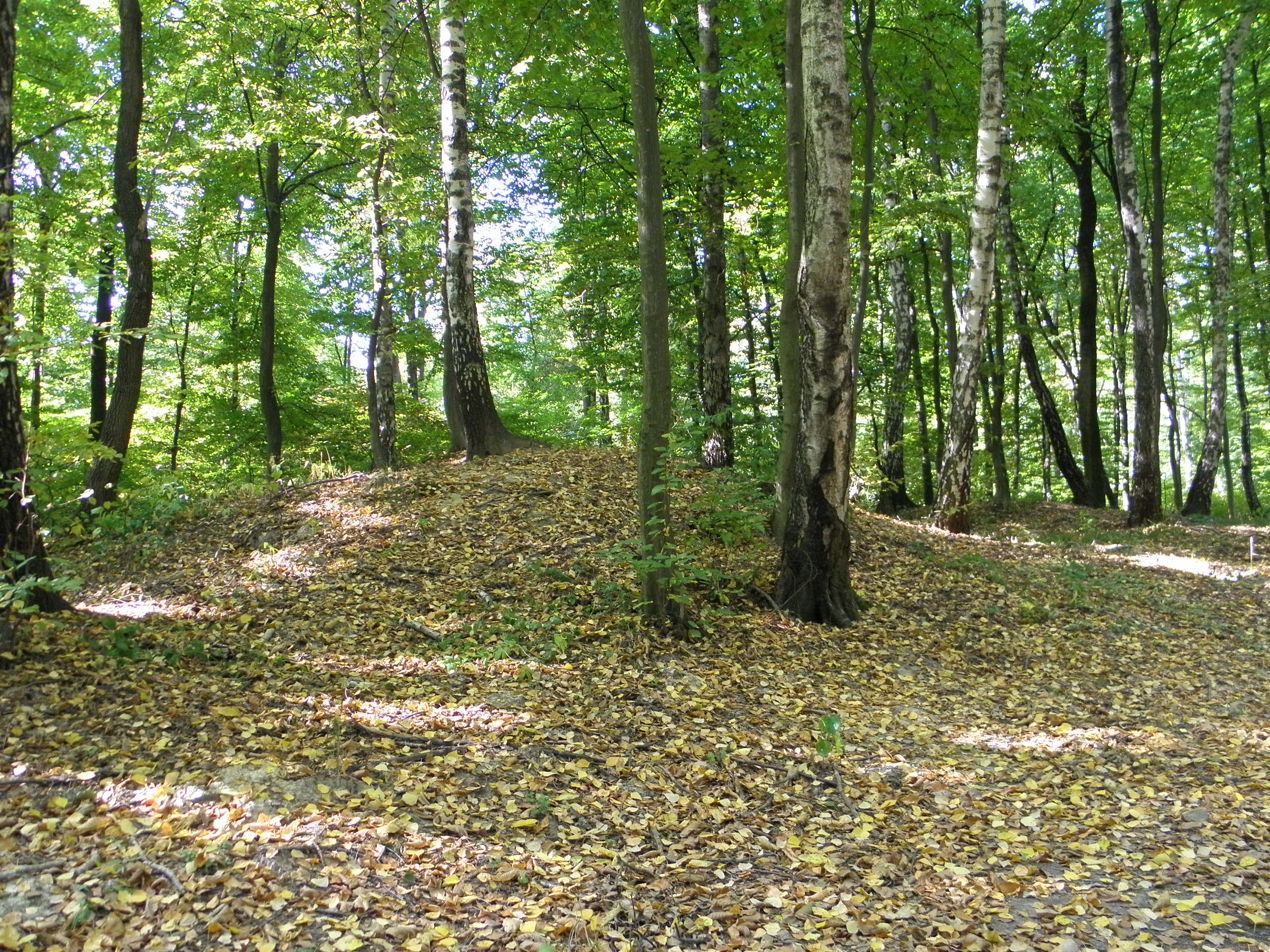
Kleczanów Forest which features ancient burial grounds from the 8th–10th century.
