= Kaḻayapiṯi =

Rock hole in Birksgate Range, South Australia

Coordinates: 27°19′19″S 130°10′5″E

Location of Kaḻayapiṯi in South Australia

Kaḻayapiṯi (also written Kaḻaya Piṯi and Kaḻaiapiṯi) is a rock hole in the Birksgate Range in northwestern South Australia. It is an important location in the early history of the Pitjantjatjara people. The name comes from the words kaḻaya (emu) and piṯi (referring to a place from which the ancestral being is believed to originate; kapi piṯi is a waterhole). It is a major sacred site for the Kaḻaya Tjukurpa (Emu Dreaming), and has been used for ceremonies by the Pitjantjatjara since long before colonisation of Australia.

Kaḻayapiṯi forms the southern heartland of the traditional Pitjantjatjara territory. According to the anthropologist Norman Tindale, the Pitjantjatjara people originally migrated from the southern coast. Kaḻayapiṯi served as their main home as they moved further north and northeast into the Tomkinson, Mann and Petermann Ranges. The rock hole here was very important during droughts, as there were few sources of water so reliable and permanent in the Great Victoria Desert to the south. However, during a long and severe drought between 1914 and 1916, the Pitjantjatjara were forced to move further east into the Musgrave Ranges, traditionally Yankunytjatjara territory.

== More reading ==
- William H. Edwards; Robert Edwards (1976), Reports on Two Visits to the Kalaya Piti Area in the Far North West of South Australia, 1965 and 1971, Ernabella Mission, OCLC 271766494
