= Sacred grove =

Grove of trees of special religious importance to a particular culture

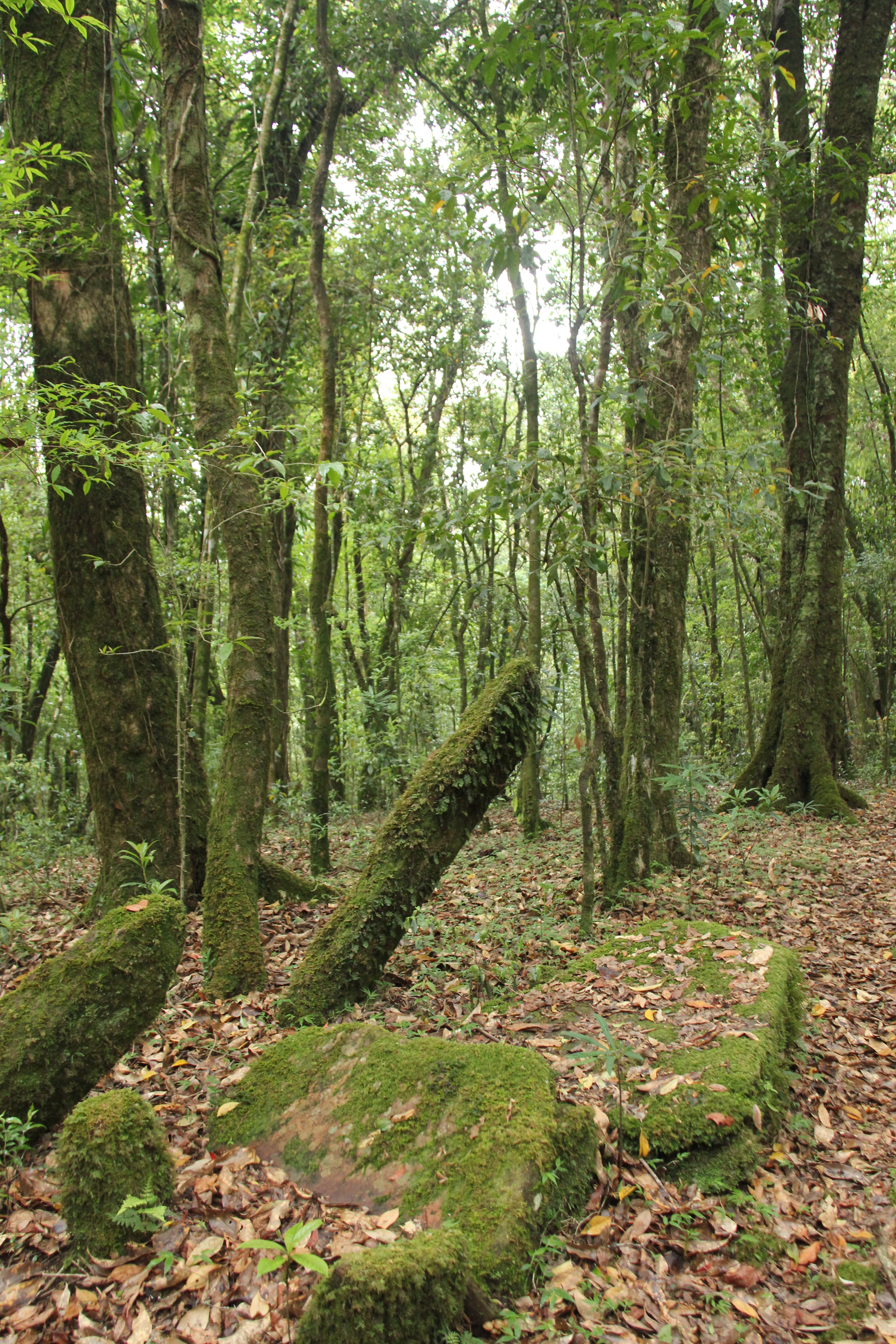
Ancient monoliths in Mawphlang sacred grove, India

Sacred groves, sacred woods, or sacred forests are groves of trees that have special religious importance within a particular culture. Sacred groves feature in various cultures throughout the world. These are forest areas that are, for the most part, untouched by local people and often protected by local communities. They often play a critical role in protecting water sources and biodiversity, including essential resources for the groups that protect them.

They were important features of the mythological landscape and cult practice of Celtic, Estonian, Baltic, Germanic, ancient Greek, Roman, Near Eastern, and Slavic polytheism. They are also found in locations such as India (Bihar, Jharkhand, Chhattisgarh, Maharashtra, Karnataka, Kerala, Tamil Nadu, West Bengal), Japan (sacred shrine forests), China (Fengshui woodland), West Africa and Ethiopia (church forests). Examples of sacred groves include the Greco-Roman temenos, various Germanic words for sacred groves, and the Celtic nemeton, which was largely but not exclusively associated with Druidic practice.

During the Northern Crusades of the Middle Ages, conquering Christians commonly built churches on the sites of sacred groves. The Lakota and various other North American tribes regard particular forests or other natural landmarks as sacred places. Singular trees which a community deems to hold religious significance are known as sacred trees.

== In history ==
=== Ancient Greece and Rome ===
The most famous sacred grove in mainland Greece was the oak grove at Dodona. Outside the walls of Athens, the site of the Platonic Academy was a sacred grove of olive trees, still recalled in the phrase "the groves of Academe".

In central Italy, the town of Nemi recalls the Latin nemus Aricinum, or "grove of Ariccia", a small town a quarter of the way around the lake. In antiquity, the area had no town, but the grove was the site of one of the most famous of Roman cults and temples: that of Diana Nemorensis, a study of which served as the seed for Sir James Frazer's seminal work on the anthropology of religion, The Golden Bough.

A sacred grove behind the House of the Vestal Virgins on the edge of the Roman Forum lingered until its last vestiges were burnt in the Great Fire of Rome in 64 CE.

In the town of Spoleto, Umbria, two stones from the late third century BCE, inscribed in archaic Latin, that established punishments for the profanation of the woods dedicated to Jupiter (Lex Luci Spoletina) have survived; they are preserved in the National Archeological Museum of Spoleto.

The Bosco Sacro (literally sacred grove) in the garden of Bomarzo, Italy, lends its associations to the uncanny atmosphere.

Lucus Pisaurensis, the Sacred Grove of Pesaro, Italy was discovered by Patrician Annibale degli Abati Olivieri in 1737 on property he owned along the 'Forbidden Road' (Collina di Calibano), just outside Pesaro. This sacred grove is the site of the Votive Stones of Pesaro and was dedicated to Salus, the ancient Roman demi-goddess of well-being.

The city of Massilia (now Marseille, France) a Greek colony, had a sacred grove so close by it that Julius Caesar had it cut down to facilitate his siege. In Pharsalia, the poet Lucan dramatized it as a place where sunlight could not reach through the branches, where no animal or bird lived, where the wind did not blow, but branches moved on their own, where human sacrifice was practiced, in a clear attempt to dramatize the situation and distract from the sacrilege entailed in its destruction.

=== Ancient Near East ===
The Bible includes elements of the tradition of sacred groves:

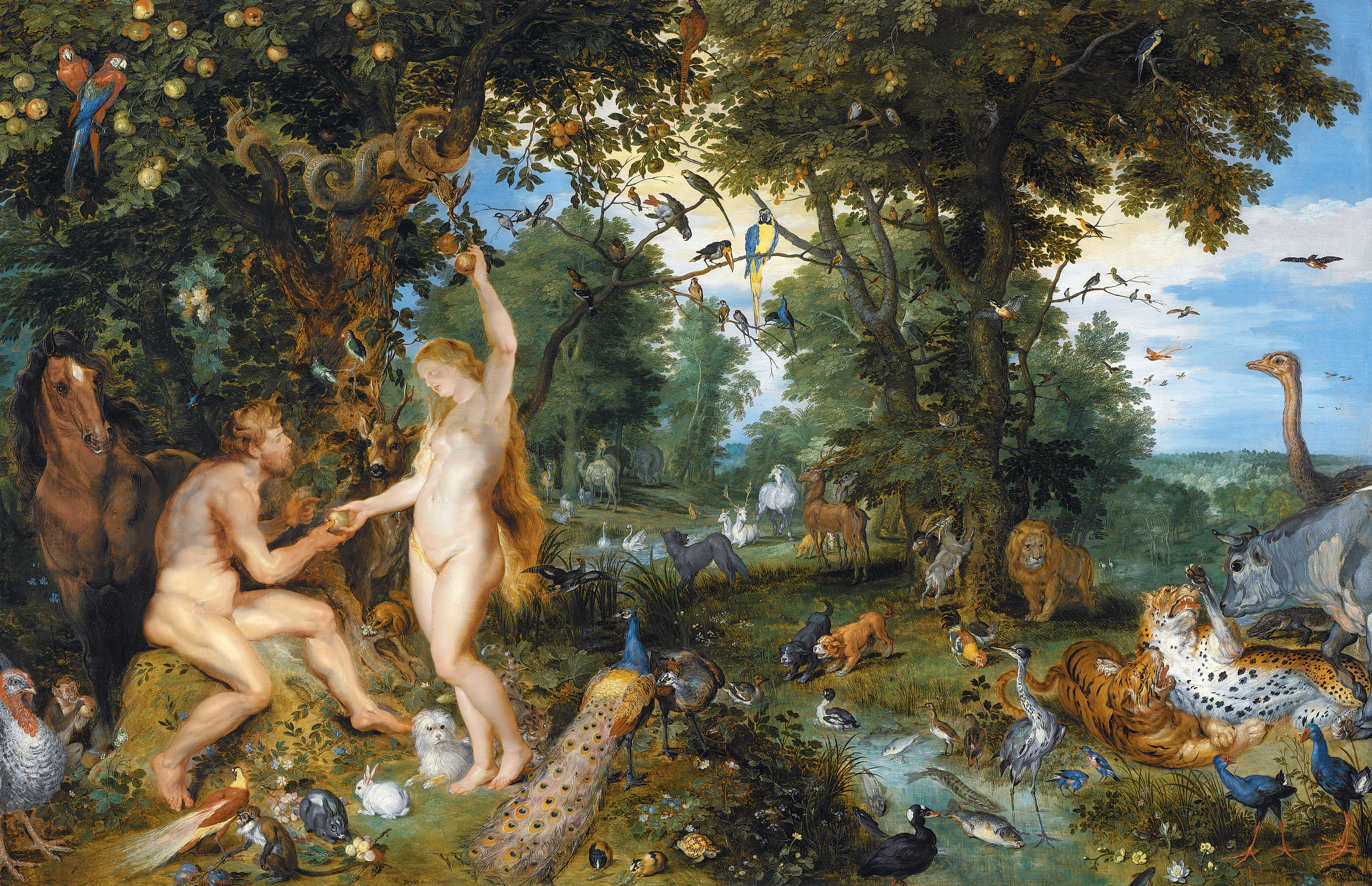
Jan Brueghel the Elder and Peter Paul Rubens - The Earthly Paradise with the Fall of Adam and Eve

The Garden of Eden, as portrayed in the Book of Genesis, is viewed as a divine, paradisiacal grove. In Judaism and Christianity the Garden is often interpreted as the idealized afterlife paradise. In Christianity, it represents a state of purity and communion with God before the Fall of Man. The Garden of Eden is also regarded as a symbolic station in the journey to the Kingdom of Heaven, which will be fully realized at the Second Coming of Christ.

In Gethsemane, the olive grove where Jesus prayed before his crucifixion, Christians believe the garden symbolizes divine interaction with nature, marking a pivotal moment in Christian salvation-history.

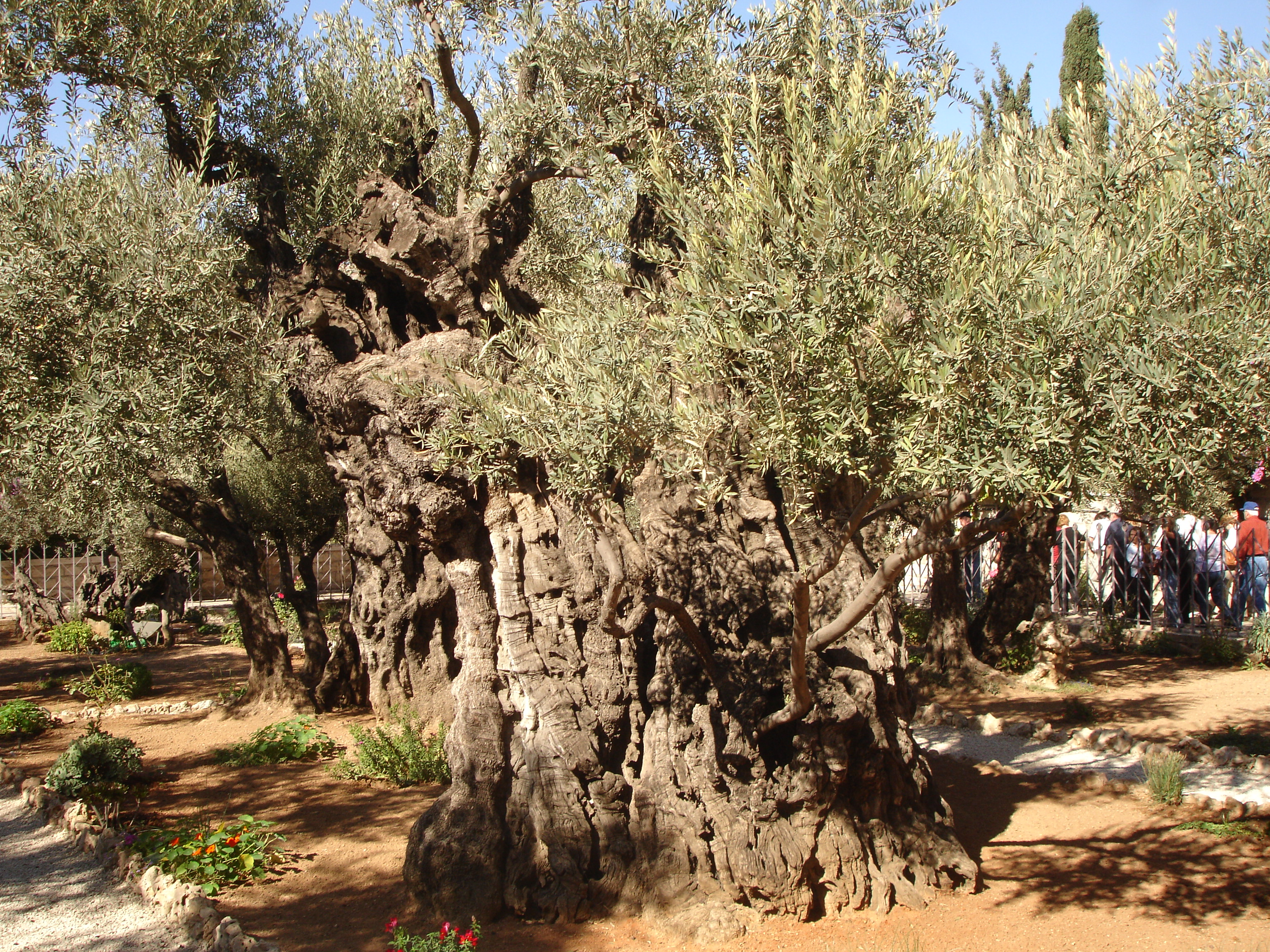
Olive trees can attain impressive age, as here at Gethsemane

Similarly, Abraham's grove: "And Abraham planted a grove in Beersheba, and called there on the name of God"(Genesis 21:33) emphasizes the religious importance of groves as sites for worship and connection to God.

Groves served as symbolic representations of deity as in 2 Kings 23:7 where the women weave hangings for the grove.

As Judaism became increasingly monotheistic and Temple-oriented, the former traditions of worship in rural groves came to have connotations of paganism, apostasy and backsliding.

In both Judaism and Christianity, sacred groves were often protected spaces, where worship was believed to maintain the divine order, and their destruction was considered sacrilegious.

Excavations at Labraunda, located in present-day Turkey, have uncovered a significant sacred grove dedicated to Zeus Stratios, a deity associated with the protection of the people and the well-being of the land. The grove was central to the Carian people, serving as a space for both religious ceremonies and communal gatherings. The ritual use of this grove highlights the belief in trees as intermediaries between the divine and human realms, where offerings and prayers were made to ensure divine favor and prosperity.

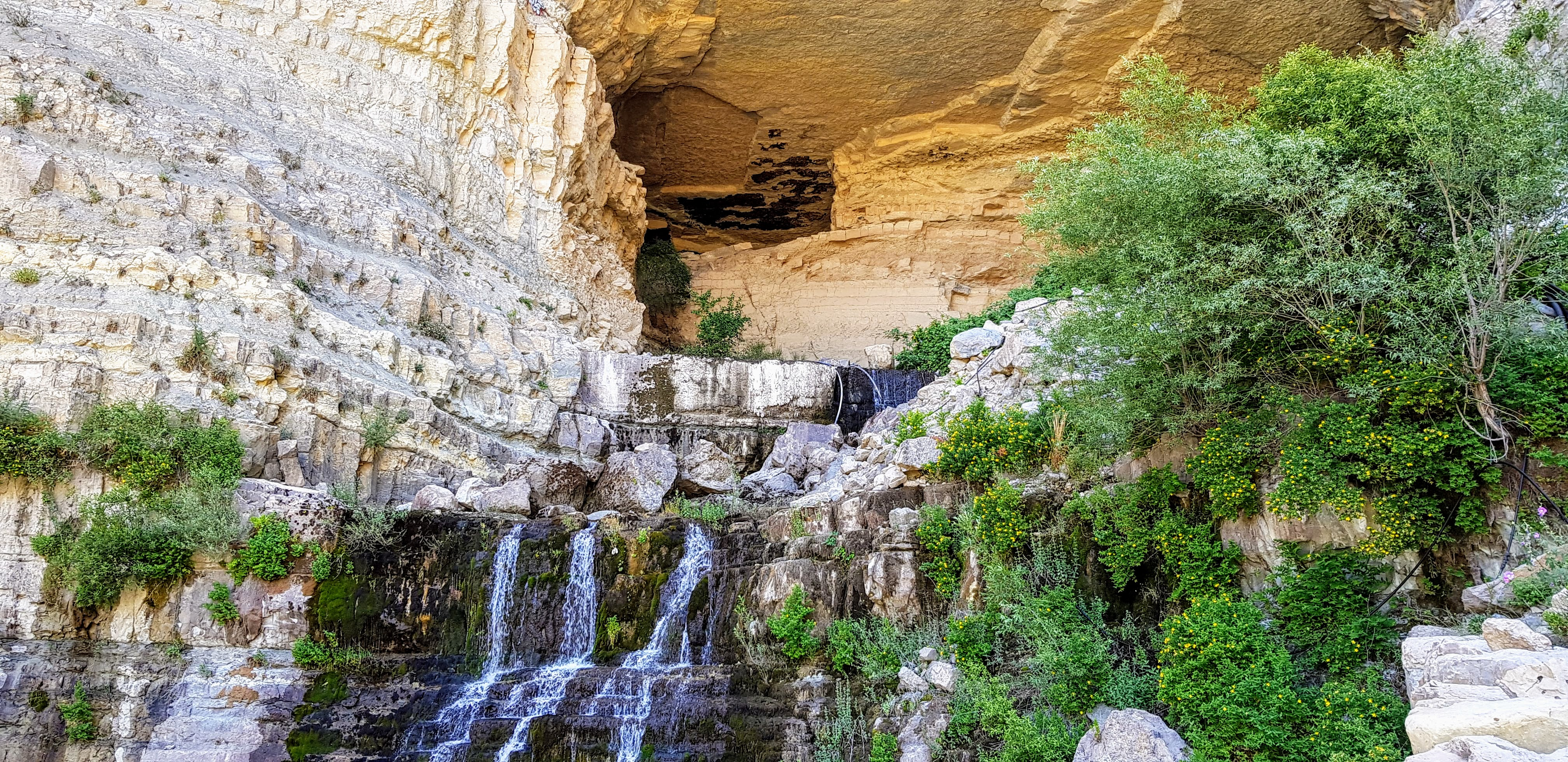
Afqa Grotto, spring of Abraham River, Lebanon

Similarly, at Afqa, located in Lebanon, there was a sacred grove dedicated to Adonis, a god of fertility, death, and rebirth. The Adonis grove was a focal point for fertility rites, symbolizing the seasonal cycle of nature. As with other sacred groves in the ancient world, the trees here were seen as living symbols of the deity's presence, reinforcing the connection between nature, agriculture, and the divine.

The reverence for groves dedicated to gods like Zeus and Adonis shows how sacred natural spaces were integral to the religious and social fabric of ancient Near Eastern cultures.

These sacred groves often became the heart of religious life in their respective regions, not only as sites for ritual but also as places of healing and divine communication, reinforcing the deep connection between nature and the divine in ancient belief-systems.

=== Baltic polytheism ===
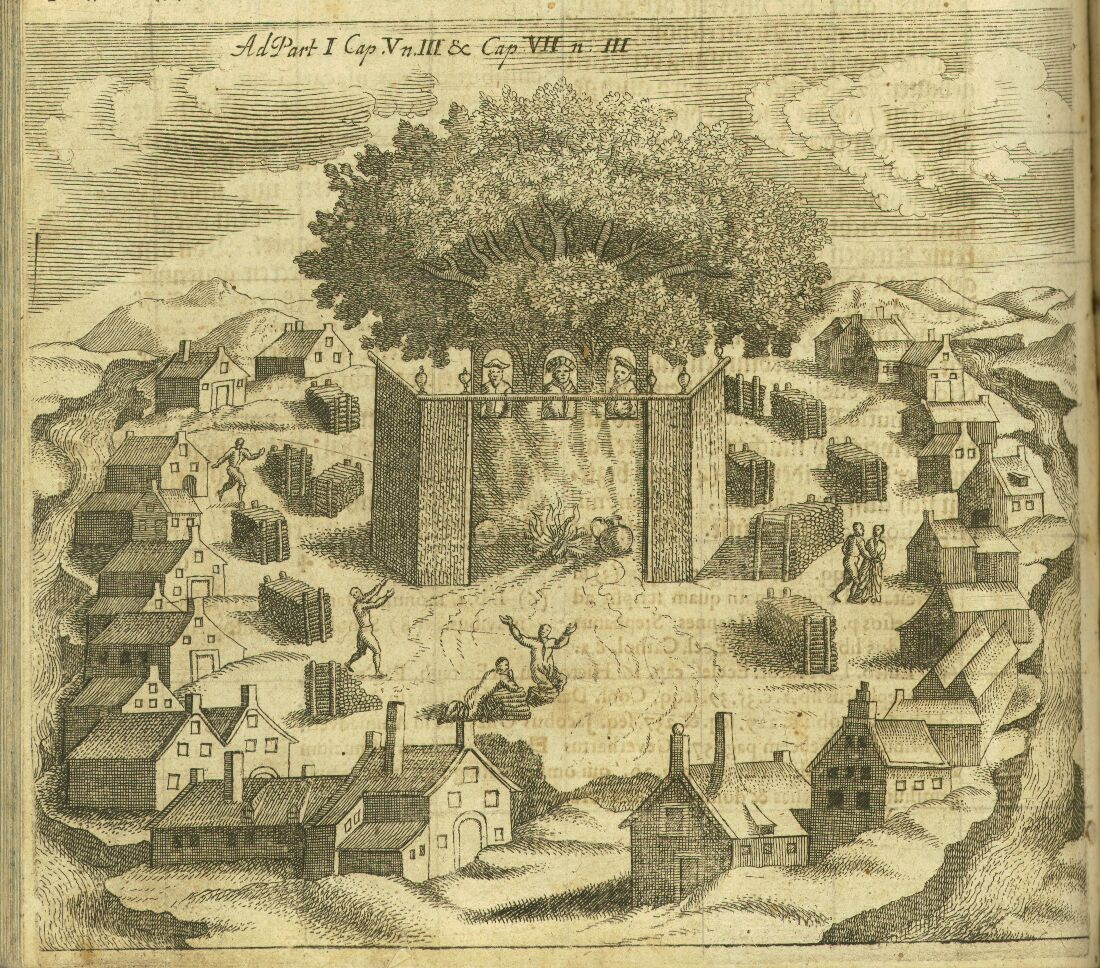
Romuva sanctuary in Prussia: a depiction based on the 16th-century account of Simon Grunau

A sacred grove is known as alka(s) in Lithuanian and elks in Latvian, however, the terms are also sometimes used to refer to natural holy places in general.

The first mention of Baltic sacred groves dates back to 1075 when Adam of Bremen noted Baltic Prussian sacred groves and springs whose sacredness was believed to be polluted by the entry of Christians (solus prohibetur accessus lucorum et fontium, quos autumant pollui christianorum accessu). A few sacred groves in Sambian Peninsula are mentioned in the 14th-century documents of the Teutonic Order (sacra sylva, que Scayte vulgariter nominatur..., silva, quae dicitur Heyligewalt...). A religious centre of intertribal significance was Romuva (Romow) in Nadruvia, Prussia, as described by Peter of Dusburg in 1326.

For Curonians sacred groves were closely associated with the cult of the dead. By the early 15th century, with the disappearance of cremation traditions among the Curonians the sacred groves of Courland had lost their crematory function but remained as an inviolable place reserved for the dead. The role of the sacred forests in the 16th-century traditions of Curonian Kings is described in a travel description by Königsberg apothecary Reinhold Lubenau:

I first reached Mummel and then passed through Courland, reaching the Curonian king, where we had to watch his pagan superstitions. Since Christmas was approaching, they went hunting in their holy forest, where they do no hunting and do not cut a single rod throughout the rest of the year. All that they now hunted there: roe deer, red deer and hares, they skinned, cooked and placed on a long table. They fastened a large number of wax candles to the table, for the souls of their parents, children and relatives. After this, standing and walking to and fro, they ate and drank, and forced us to do likewise. Later, they brought an empty beer keg and beat on it with two sticks, and the men and women, as well as the children, danced around the table, something that continued for the whole night. When they went to bed one after another, they invited us to eat and take with us what we would, since they would not eat what was left over, but would give it to the dogs. Neither did they want to take any payment from us for what we had eaten.

— Reinhold Lubenau (20 December 1585)

=== Celtic polytheism ===
The Celts used sacred groves, called nemeton in Gaulish, for performing rituals, based on Celtic mythology. The deity involved was usually Nemetona – a Celtic goddess. Druids oversaw such rituals. Existence of such groves have been found in Germany, Switzerland, Czech Republic and Hungary in Central Europe, in many sites of ancient Gaul in France, as well as England and Northern Ireland. Sacred groves had been plentiful up until the 1st century BC, when the Romans attacked and conquered Gaul. One of the best known nemeton sites is that in the Nevet forest near Locronan in Brittany, France. Gournay-sur-Aronde (Gournay-on-Aronde), a village in the Oise department of France, also houses the remains of a nemeton.

Nemetons were often fenced off by enclosures, as indicated by the German term Viereckschanze – meaning a quadrangular space surrounded by a ditch enclosed by wooden palisades.

Many of these groves, like the sacred grove at Didyma, Turkey are thought to be nemetons, sacred groves protected by druids based on Celtic mythology. In fact, according to Strabo, the central shrine at Galatia was called Drunemeton. Some of these were also sacred groves in Greek times (as in the case of Didyma), but were based on a different or slightly changed mythology.

=== Germanic paganism ===
Trees hold a particular role in Germanic paganism and Germanic mythology, both as individuals (sacred trees) and in groups (sacred groves). Their central role is noted in the earliest accounts, with Roman historian Tacitus reporting Germanic cult practices occurred exclusively in groves, not temples. Scholars consider that reverence for and rites performed at individual trees are derived from the mythological role of the world tree, Yggdrasil; onomastic and some historical evidence also connects individual deities to both groves and individual trees. After Christianization, trees continue to play a significant role in the folk beliefs of the Germanic peoples.

== Today ==
=== Africa ===
==== Benin and Togo ====
Across Benin and Togo (Dahomey Gap, West Africa), sacred forests form islands of biodiversity in the middle of overgrazed, woody, semiarid savannahs and croplands. Due to their tendency to be maintained over long periods of time, the sacred forests contain valuable remnants of ecological communities from the once extensive forests. Soils in these forests store significant amounts soil carbon as both soil organic carbon (SOC) and soil inorganic carbon (SIC). Soil inorganic carbon is an important carbon sink because it preserved over a longer time frame than the soil organic carbon. There is a high potential for development of the soils for potential carbon sequestration.

==== Ghana ====
Sacred groves are also present in Ghana. One of Ghana's most famous sacred groves – the Buoyem Sacred Grove – and numerous other sacred groves are present in the Techiman Municipal District and nearby districts of the Brong Ahafo Region. They provide a refuge for wildlife which has been exterminated in nearby areas, and one grove most notably houses 20,000 fruit bats in caves. The capital of the historical Ghana Empire, contained a sacred grove called al-gâba (Ar. "the forest") for performing religious rites of the Soninke people. Other sacred groves in Ghana include sacred groves along the coastal savannahs of Ghana. Many sacred groves in Ghana are now under federal protection – like the Anweam Sacred Grove in the Esukawkaw Forest Reserve Other well-known sacred groves in present-day Ghana include the Malshegu Sacred Grove in Northern Ghana – one of the last remaining closed-canopy forests in the savannah regions, and the Jachie sacred grove.

The Tanoboase Sacred Grove and Shrine is located near the village of Tanoboase in the Techiman, Brong Ahafo region of Ghana. The site is home of the Bono people.

==== Kenya ====
There are many groups of trees and groves that remain sacred to local indigenous populations, such as the Kikuyu, the Maasai, and the Mbeere tribe of central Kenya. In 2008, the Kaya forests, a group of 10 forest sites spread over 200 km (124 mi), were made a World Heritage Site by UNESCO. They are a series of forests located along the coast of Kenya, accompanied by fortified villages known as kayas. These kayas were originally built in the 16th century but have uninhabited since the 1940s. They are now regarded as sacred sites.

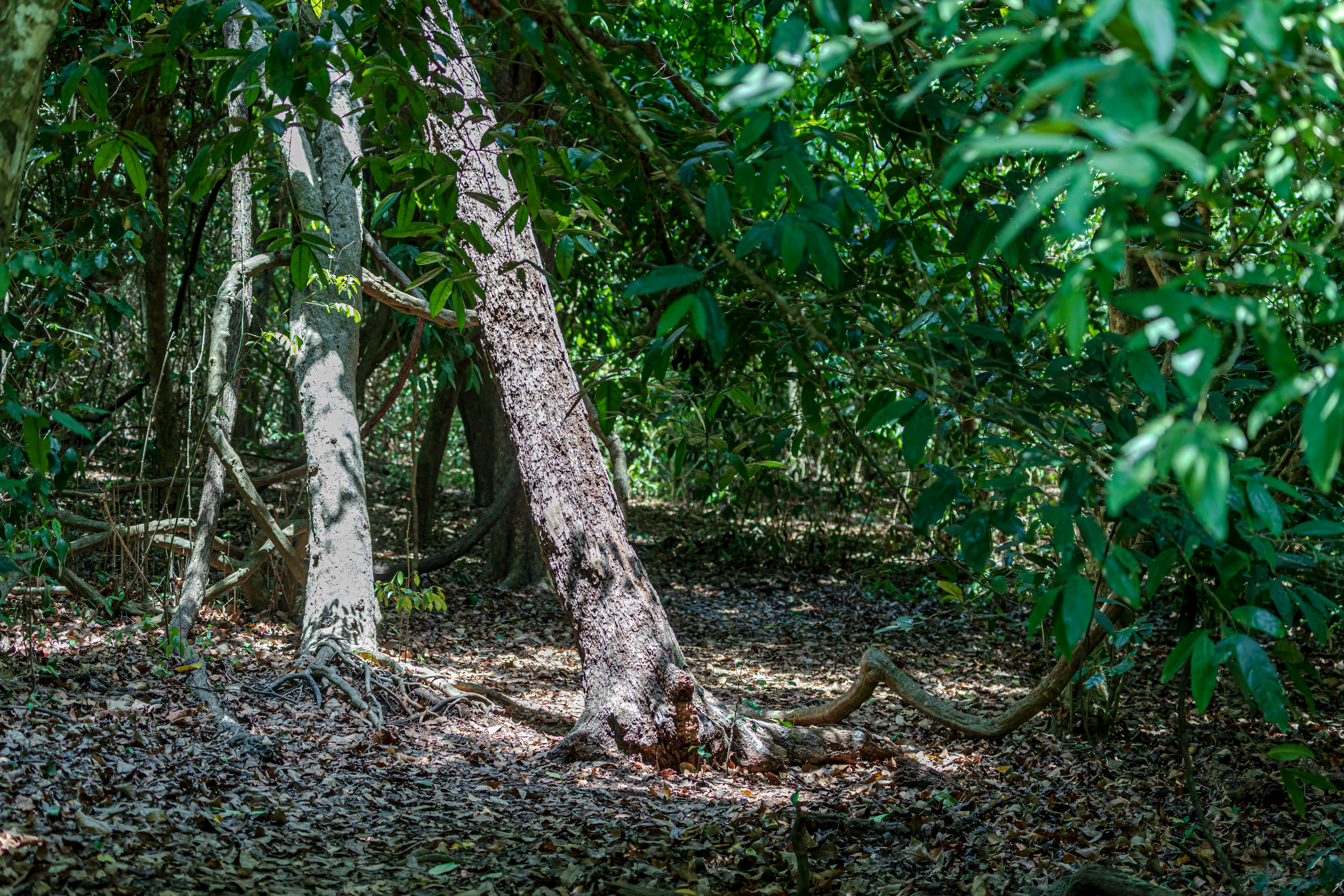
Kaya Kinondo Sacred Forest, Kenya, one of the 10 forest locations of the Kaya forests.

Mount Kenya is a mountain of volcanic origin that stands 5,199 metres (17,057 feet) tall. It has a unique forest and plant ecosystem that holds significant biological and cultural importance, and is home to over 882 plant species. In 1949, it was designated a national park, and in 1978, the UNESCO Man and the Biosphere Programme named it a Biosphere Reserve. It is considered a sacred site by the Kikuyu, who believed that the top of the mountain was the 'house' of God.

Ramogi hill is located in the Siaya County of western Kenya. The hill and forest cover a distance of 283 hectares (699 acres) and is home to rich flora including trees, shrubs, flowers, over 100 plant species in total. It is an important historical site for the Luo people of western Kenya, and is said to be the first site they established after migrating from South Sudan. The hill is named after Ramogi, a notable Luo leader. The hill and forests are considered holy and sacred, and the Luo people use the hill for cultural and religious practices, including as a source of herbal medicine and a place of meditation. According to the Luo people, the medicinal plants that grow in the forests of Ramogi hill are considered to have strong healing powers.

==== Nigeria ====
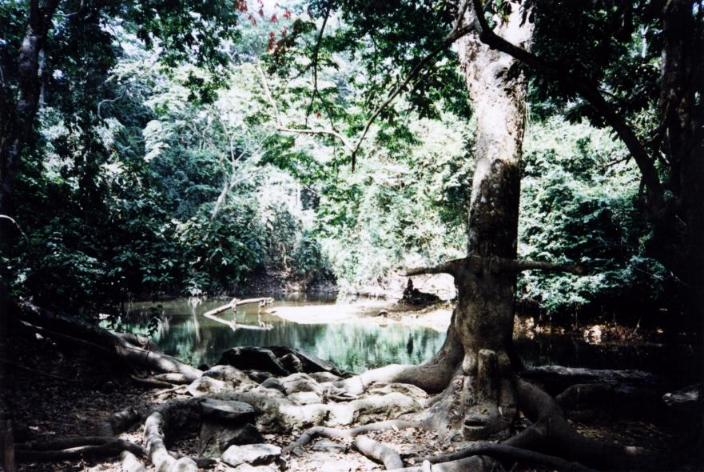
Osun-Osogbo Sacred Grove, Nigeria

The concept of sacred groves is present in Nigerian mythology as well. The Osun-Osogbo Sacred Grove, containing dense forests, is located just outside the city of Osogbo, and is regarded as one of the last virgin high forests in Nigeria. It is dedicated to the fertility goddess in Yoruba mythology, and is dotted with shrines and sculptures. Oloye Susanne Wenger, an Austrian artist, helped revive the grove. The grove was declared a UNESCO World Heritage Site in 2005.

=== Asia ===
Sacred forests continue to hold an important place in the everyday lives of Indigenous and rural people across South, East, and Southeast Asia. A large-scale comparative analysis of sacred groves in ten countries within these regions indicates that they have long played a critical role in the protection of watersheds and water sources.

==== Cambodia ====
Indigenous Bunong people in Mondulkiri province, Cambodia consider forests to be sacred. Deforestation and land concessions in the country has threatened their land tenure and traditions.

==== India ====
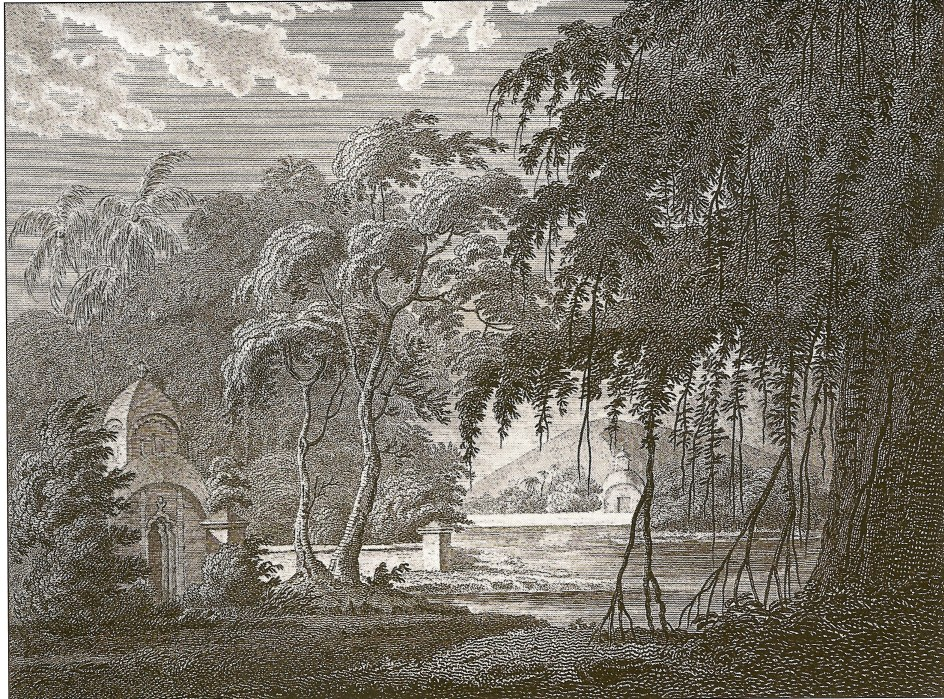
The Sacred Hindoo Grove near Chandod on the Banks of the Nerbudda by James Forbes, 1782

In India, sacred groves are scattered all over the country, and do enjoy protection. Prior to 2002, these forest regions were not recognized under any of the existing laws. But in 2002 an amendment was brought in Wildlife Protection Act, 1972 to include Sacred Groves under the act. In 2016, a framework was published by the intergovernmental organization ICIMOD to help assess the present day significance of sacred natural sites, including sacred groves in all Himalayan countries to enable better policy uptake of these sites. Some NGOs and Companies like Margastha Research Foundation, Backyard Botanist and Global Achievement Trust work with local villagers to protect such groves. Each grove is associated with a presiding deity, and the groves are referred to by different names in different parts of India. They were maintained by local communities with hunting and logging strictly prohibited within these patches. While most of these sacred deities are associated with local Hindu gods, sacred groves of Islamic and Buddhist origins are also known. Sacred groves occur in a variety of places – from scrub forests in the Thar Desert of Rajasthan maintained by the Bishnois, to rain forests in the Kerala Western Ghats. Himachal Pradesh in the North and Kerala in the South are specifically known for their large numbers of sacred groves. The Kodavas of Karnataka maintained over 1000 sacred groves in Kodagu alone.

The district of Uttara Kannada in Karnataka also harbours a large number of sacred groves.

Around 14,000 sacred groves have been reported from all over India, which act as reservoirs of rare fauna, and more often rare flora, amid rural and even urban settings. Experts believe that the total number of sacred groves could be as high as 100,000. Threats to the groves include urbanization, and over-exploitation of resources. While many of the groves are looked upon as abode of Hindu gods, in the recent past a number of them have been partially cleared for construction of shrines and temples.

Ritualistic dances and dramatizations based on the local deities that protect the groves are called Theyyam in Kerala and Nagmandalam, among other names, in Karnataka. There are sacred groves in Ernakulam region in a place named Mangatoor in Kerala. Sacred groves are being destroyed as a part of urbanization. The family "Nalukettil Puthenpurayil" still protects sacred groves.

Dev Bhoomi, or the "Land of Gods," is part of the 133 sacred groves in the foothills of the Himalayas in Uttarakhand. Known for its rivers, lakes, caves, and forests, it is considered the holiest land in the region. Local communities honor deities like Haat Kaali, Kotgyari Devi, and Mahakaali. Unlike typical forests, these sacred groves are alpine meadows, deeply tied to the ethnic identity of local groups. Their survival is believed to depend on oral traditions, with no written laws. Customary taboos forbid harming the groves, including plucking flowers, uprooting plants, or disturbing animals and religious objects. Despite the abundance of sacred groves in India, they are gradually disappearing due to cultural shifts and growing pressure to exploit the natural resources within these groves.

Mawphlang sacred forest or grove is situated in Mawphlang, a village in the East Khasi Hills district of Meghalaya state in north-eastern India, 25 kilometers from Shillong. The word maw means "stone", maw phlang means "grassy stone," and is one of many settlements in the Khasi hills named after monoliths.[1] Mawphlang is the site of one of the Khasi Hills sacred groves.[2][3] Khasi heritage village - located in the Mawphlang district - is considered to be the hub of Khasi culture.

==== Japan ====
Sacred groves in Japan are typically associated with Shinto shrines and are located all over Japan. They have existed since ancient times and shrines are often built in the midst of preexisting groves. The Cryptomeria tree is venerated in Shinto practice, and considered sacred.

Among the sacred groves associated with such jinjas or Shinto shrines is the 20-hectare wooded area associated with Atsuta Shrine (熱田神宮, Atsuta-jingū) at Atsuta-ku, Nagoya. The 1500-hectare forest associated with Kashima Shrine was declared a "protected area" in 1953. Today it is part of the Kashima Wildlife Preservation Area. The woods include over 800 kinds of trees and varied animal and plant life.

Tadasu no Mori (糺の森) is a general term for a wooded area associated with the Kamo Shrine, which is a Shinto sanctuary near the banks of the Kamo River in northeast Kyoto. The ambit of today's forest encompasses approximately 12.4 hectares, which are preserved as a national historic site (国の史跡). The Kamigamo Shrine and the Shimogamo Shrine, along with other Historic Monuments of Ancient Kyoto (Kyoto, Uji and Otsu Cities), have been designated World Heritage Sites since 1994.

===== Okinawa =====
The Utaki sacred sites (often with associated burial grounds) on Okinawa are based on Ryukyuan religion, and usually are associated with toun or kami-asagi – regions dedicated to the gods where people are forbidden to go. Sacred groves are often present in such places, as also in Gusukus – fortified areas which contain sacred sites within them. The Seifa-utaki was designated as a UNESCO World Heritage Site designated in 2003. It consists of a triangular cavern formed by gigantic rocks, and contains a sacred grove with rare, indigenous trees like the Kubanoki (a kind of palm) and the yabunikkei or Cinnamomum japonicum (a form of wild cinnamon). Direct access to the grove is forbidden.

==== Malaysia ====
Much of the ways of the ancient inhabitants of Malaysia have largely been forgotten, mostly due to the taboos among the local populace on putting certain esoteric knowledge down in ink, thus only passed down through examples and word of mouth from mother to daughter and father to son. However, much can be observed by the ways and habits of the natives of Malaysia which include 18 tribes of Orang Asli (Malay for Natural People) and the Malays, who are often regarded as the 19th tribe.

There is a practice of tree planting around houses to the extent that the walls and wooden structures are allowed to give way to the roots of creeping plants, purposely sown at the bases of these structures. With increased migration towards the larger cities, these houses are abandoned and allowed to return to nature. As most traditional Orang Asli and Malay houses are made of only wood, bamboo, rattan and woven palm leaves (being built without using a single nail), the remains of those houses crumble easily into its surrounding.

Besides that, a practice of creating arches of vine and creeping flowering plants so that each time one were to enter the gates of the house, one has to bow, as if implying or imitating respect upon entry to a sacred grove which were practiced by their ancestors. Such practices are even performed by those who have migrated into the cities who prefer to live in houses on the ground, rather than in high rise apartments. A garden of fruit trees surrounded by larger trees are planted around the houses to provide shade and an illusion of being at 'home' as well as to provide sustenance (in the form of fruits and seeds) to squirrels, foxes, insects and birds. Commonly, a cat, or in most instances, many cats are kept to patrol the gardens and guard from harmful spirits as well as against rats which were believed to carry unclean spirits and diseases.

However, one of the most striking examples of the tree reverence among them can be seen in the graveyards which are considered as holy ground, on which no stone structure can be built upon. The whole area are covered by large and tall trees, so much foliage that the scorching tropical sun is reduced to a dim shadow as temperatures drop to a comfortable cool. Malay folklore relates that the trees whisper prayers to the creator in absolution of the past transgression of the ground's once human inhabitants. The trees are also allowed to take root into the graves where the grave keepers (penjaga kubur in Malay) slowly remove gravestones (which used to be made from wood) as they are ejected from the grounds onto the surface. There is also a ritual of planting small tree sapling on fresh graves by family members who will then water it and tend to it periodically. Petals from fresh red and pink roses are also brought upon visitation to be scattered on the graves and a ritual of pouring rose water upon the soils are also performed.

The Malays regard visiting the graves from between sunset to sunrise as a taboo as it is believed that as sunrise is the beginning of the day to mankind, sunset is perceived as the beginning of day to those who dwell in the grave area. Burials are almost always postponed until the next day except in certain cases where it is allowed, provided that additional rules are observed, such as, women and children are not allowed at the night time burial ceremony.

An ancient ritual of renaming the deceased as she or he is laid into the earth is also practiced. The Orang Asli and Malay (see Malaysian names) naming system has a living name and a spirit name, which is given during the ritual of burial. This name is known as nama arwah (spirit name). The living name is usually the given name plus the word 'anak' which means 'son/daughter of' or 'bin' and 'binti' which mean 'son of' or 'daughter of' respectively; followed by the name of the father. When a person dies, the father's name is replaced with his or her mother's name and this is made known during the reading of burial sentences.

==== Nepal ====
Granted World Heritage status by UNESCO in 1997, Lumbini Grove is a Buddhist pilgrimage site in the Rupandehi District of Nepal. It is the place where, according to Buddhist tradition, Queen Mayadevi gave birth to Siddhartha Gautama in 623 BCE. Gautama, who achieved nirvana some time around 543 BCE, became the Lord Gautama Buddha and founded Buddhism after achieving Enlightenment. The Mayadevi Temple is located at Lumbini.

==== Philippines ====
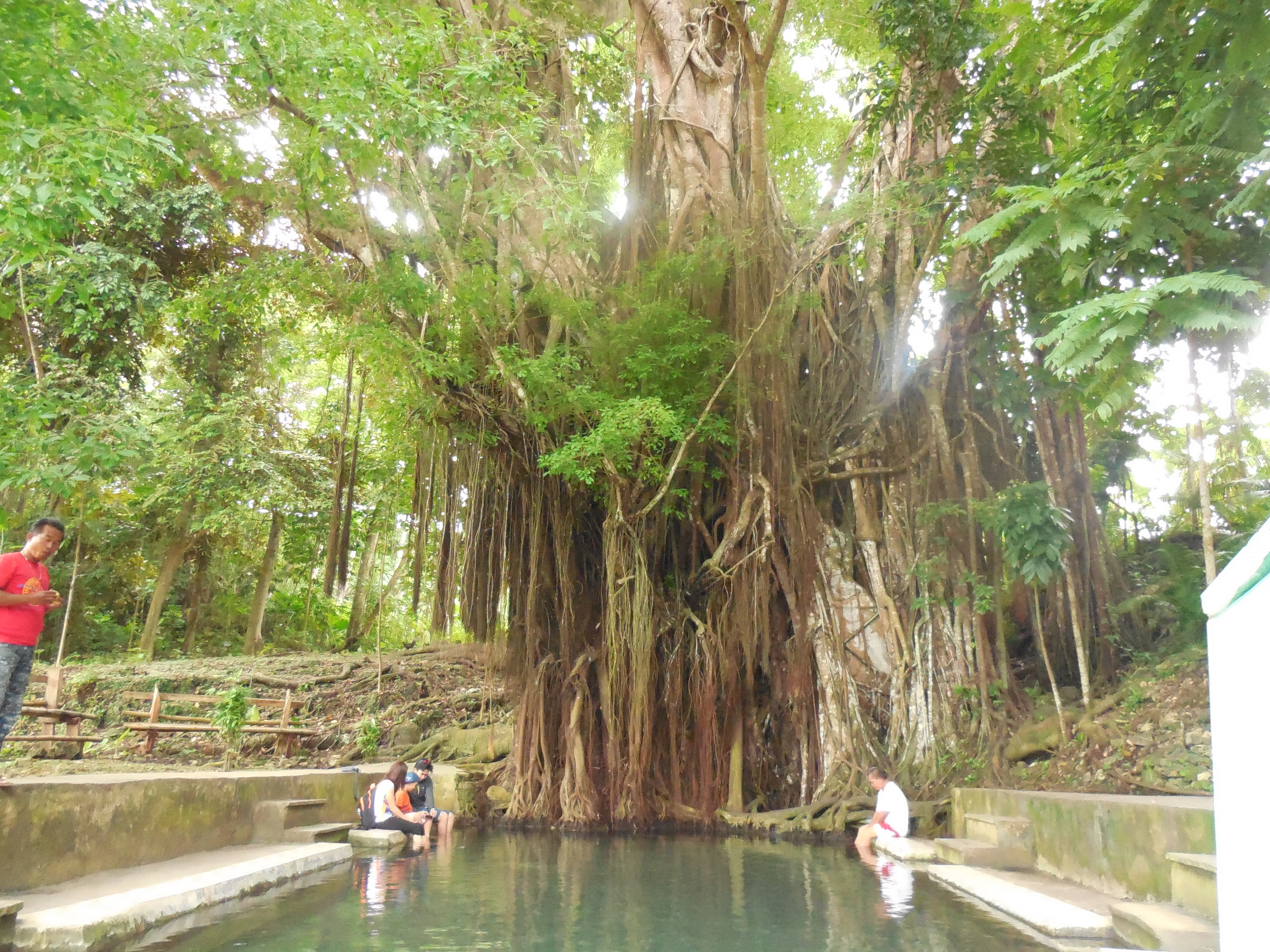
A 400-year old balete tree with a natural spring between its roots in Lazi, Siquijor, Philippines. It is believed to be home to diwata (anito) spirits.

In the animistic native Filipino religion called Bathala, the worshiping anito spirits, balete trees (Ficus spp.), also known as nonok or nunuk, are regarded as abodes of spirits or gateways to the spirit world. Cutting them down was taboo, a superstition that is still followed today. Outdoor shrines or altars known as dambana, latangan, and tambara among other names were often built near the trees during shaman rituals. Aside from individual trees, natural formations, bodies of water, rocks, groves, and even entire forests also commonly became sacred places to various communities.

==== Thailand ====
Sacred groves, mostly connected to Thai folk belief, are known to have existed in Thailand since medieval times.

Recently, new areas are being marked off as sacred as part of a movement for environmental protection. For instance, in her 1998 study of the ecology movement in Thailand, Susan Darlington examines the practice of tree ordination as a way to engage in environmental protection. She shows how the Buddhist ritual of ordination is adapted - by the ritualised wrapping of saffron robes around the largest tree in the forest - by activist Buddhist monks (also known as "Eco Monks") to sacralise their community forest and thereby contribute to its protection. This ritual is part of broader efforts of education and training to raise ecological awareness and encourage sustainable farming practices in local communities and Thailand.

==== Singapore ====
Keramat Kusu is an island with keramat graves.

=== Europe ===
==== Estonia ====
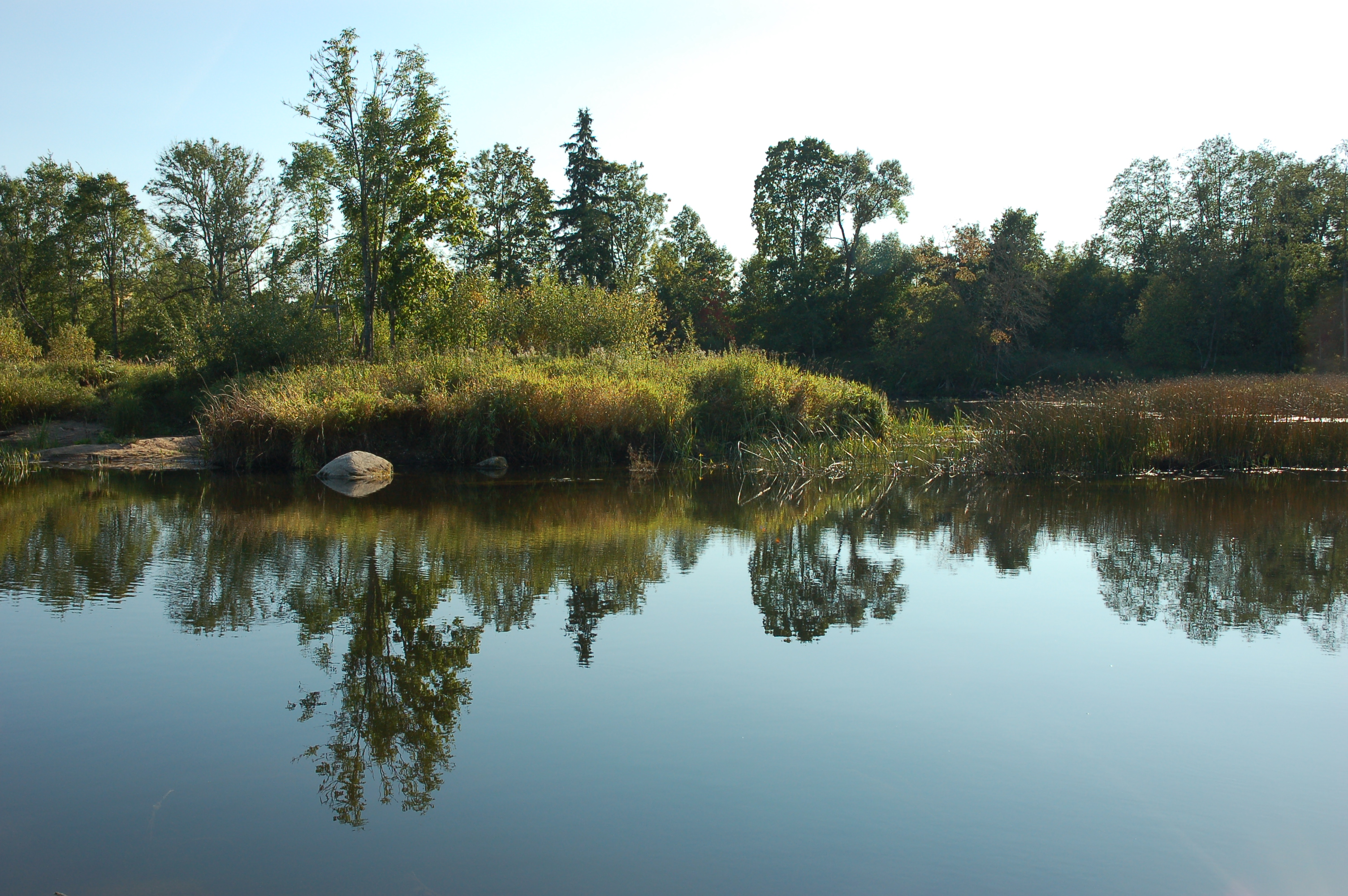
Sacred Grove Island in Tori Parish, Pärnumaa, Estonia

Based on historical data, it is estimated that there are around 2500 sacred natural sites in Estonia, the largest of them covering up to 100 hectares. Although rather exceptional among most of the technologically developed countries, in Estonia both the sacred natural sites and indigenous customs connected to them are still in use. Therefore, the heritage that is connected to sacred natural sites has great importance to the national identity and environment of Estonians.

In a collaboration between followers of Estonian native religion (Maausk) and governmental ministries, a national plan was prepared in 2008: "Sacred Natural Sites in Estonia: Study and Conservation 2008–2012" which includes about 550 sacred groves (Estonian: hiis). The National Plan on Sacred Natural Sites consists of a historical overview of sacred natural sites in Estonia, a current situation analysis, and several concrete conservation measures and instructions on how to apply them. The coordinating steering committee of the Conservation Plan consists of Environment, Agriculture, Internal Affairs and Education and Research ministries, National Heritage Board and MK. The University of Tartu is the implementing agency. Measures of the Conservation Plan are designed to handle natural sanctuaries and values connected to them in all aspects.

The Conservation Plan foresees creating a database which supports researching and managing natural sanctuaries. The database would consist of folkloric, archaeological, natural, historical and other data on sacred natural sites and provide information on the exact location, condition and form of ownership of each site. In 2011 a scandal occurred when a company started clearcutting Rebala's sacred grove nearby Maardu manor due to a misunderstanding between the Environmental Board and the National Heritage Board.

==== Russia ====
Both the prechristian Slavic pagans and some Siberian pagans of the modern era considered trees or forests themselves sacred. Throughout the boreal forests of Siberia, there are upwards of 600 known sacred groves and over twice that number are estimated to exist. These are most prominent in Komi, Buryatia, Irktusk, and the Sakha Republic.

==== Finland ====
Finnish hiisi sites are locations where the dead and spirits of ancestors are worshipped and respected. While the exact definition of the word hiisi is still unclear, they are often describes as situated on the top of stony mountains or hills and are often close to water. Hiisi sites are considered holy groves. In 1967, the linguist Mauno Koski produced a list of hiisi sites in his doctoral thesis. In list, he mentions 14 possible hiisi sites, mostly from the provinces of Southwest Finland, Satakunta, and Häme. The word hiisi is used in archaeological literature as denoting a pre-Christian burial site or sacred grove, and the negative connotations of the word (devil, demon) probably developed during Christian times.

==== Latvia ====
There are three known sacred groves associated with the seven Curonian King villages in Turlava parish, Courland. The most famous one of them is the Ķoniņi Elka Grove (Ķoniņu Elka birzs) or simply Elka that today covers around one hectare of land and is protected as an archaeological monument of national importance. Folklore researcher Sandis Laime has suggested that the sacred grove might have been a religious centre and probably covered a more extensive area in the past. He points to the toponym Elka Meadow (Elku pļava) localized approximately 1.5 kilometres from the remaining grove and speculates that the meadow could have retained its original name even after the part of the sacred grove on it was cut down. Nowadays a strong oral tradition persists among the Turlava area residents regarding the prohibition of certain actions in the grove and the misfortune that may follow if the prohibitions are not abided.

==== Lithuania ====
There are around 40 known sacred groves and forests in Lithuania. Lithuanian archaeologist Vykintas Vaitkevičius has grouped some of the sacred forests and groves according to the components šventas (13), alka (11) and gojus (more than 520) in their name.

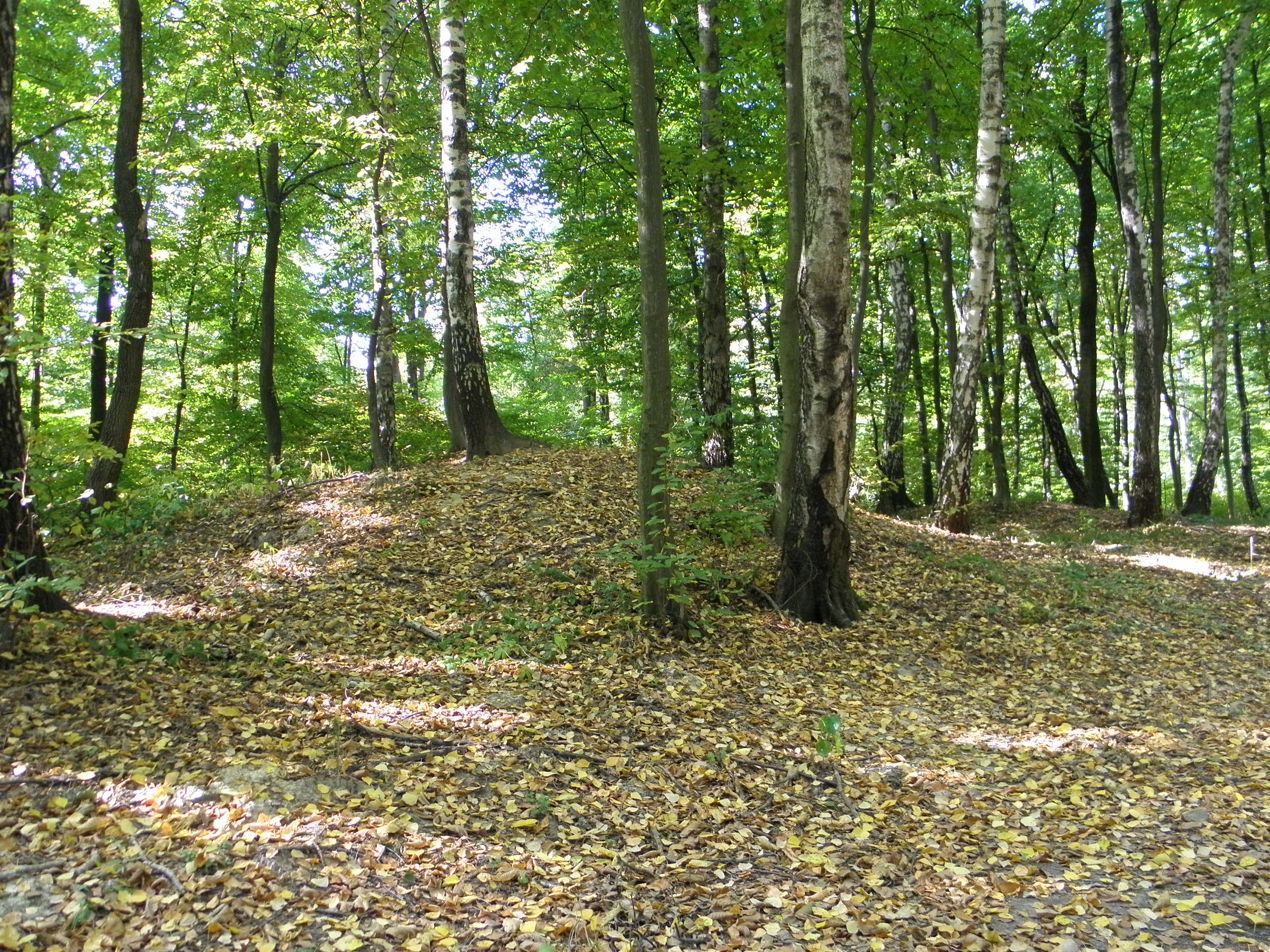
Kleczanów Forest, a sacred forest in Poland located in the vicinity of the village Kleczanów.

==== Poland ====
Kleczanów Forest is a sacred forest in the vicinity of Kleczanów village in Sandomierz County, Poland. It features an ancient site of 37 Slavic kurgans (burial mounds) 4–10 metres high.The small forest complex (approximately 5 hectares) is surrounded by agricultural fields and is unique in the region. The first burials are believed to have started in the Kleczanów woods in the late Stone Age and continued into the 10th and 11th centuries. The prehistoric cemetery was discovered by Polish archaeologists in the 1990s. In pagan times, the site could have been a Slavic sacred wood (gaj), a place where people worshipped and used to bury their relatives. Although the surrounding landscape was transformed into farmland, the Kleczanów Woods survived untouched. For 1,000 years, the religious community of Kleczanów used to celebrate Pentecost feasts and the Whitsun festival there.

=== Americas ===
==== United States ====
The Lakota and various other North American tribes consider particular forests or other natural landmarks to be sacred. This is one of the reasons that there has been recent dispute over the nullification of acknowledgment of Native American reservation land by the US government and an attempt to compensate Native Americans for the reacquisition of this sacred space.

== Ecology ==
Sacred groves are found to be some of the first examples of habitat and ecological protection in human history, due to the spiritual importance of the area. Due to this historical protection, sacred groves have been found to harbor larger amounts as well as more breadth of biodiversity than surrounding areas.

== In fiction ==
- J. R. R. Tolkien included many magical trees and woods in his fictional writings which he based on English and Norse mythology.
- George R. R. Martin's A Song of Ice and Fire features "godswoods", sacred groves containing sacred trees, notably "weirwood" trees but also oaks, et al.
- In The Legend of Zelda video game series there is a location called the Sacred Grove in Hyrule, usually depicted as a gateway to the Temple of Time and thus the Sacred Realm, one of the most important locations in the series' backstory.
- In MTV's Teen Wolf, a sacred tree known as a nemeton serves as a beacon for supernatural creatures and retained some of its power even after being cut down.
- In the Hayao Miyazaki animated film My Neighbor Totoro the large tree in which the Totoros live is modeled after a 2000-year-old sacred camphor tree in Japan.
- James Cameron's Avatar, the natives of Pandora, the Na'vi, live in a massive tree called Hometree and at the center of their sacred grove is the Tree of Souls.

== See also ==
- Sacred related
  - Sacred trees
    - Bodhi Tree
    - List of banyan trees in India
    - Sacred groves of India
    - Sacred trees and groves in Germanic paganism and mythology
    - Trees in mythology
    - Tree worship
  - Sacred mountain
  - Sacred natural site
  - Sacred space
  - Sacred waters
- General
  - List of types of formally designated forests
  - Superlative trees
  - Tree hugger (disambiguation)
