= Sacred natural site =

Geographic feature with spiritual significance

A sacred natural site is a natural feature or a large area of land or water having special spiritual significance to peoples and communities. Sacred natural sites consist of all types of natural features including mountains, hills, forests, groves, trees, rivers, lakes, lagoons, caves, islands and springs. They are often considered sacred spaces.

== Overview ==
Sacred natural sites are natural features in or areas of land or water having special spiritual significance to peoples and communities. This working definition is broad and can be used as a basis for more specific articulations. Whilst "sacred natural sites" is the main term used, for reasons of variety and readability, other terms are used interchangeably, including sacred site, sacred place and sacred area.

One interest in sacred natural sites from the perspective of nature conservation can lie in the components of biological diversity that they harbour, such as the species of animals and plants, the habitats and ecosystems, as well as the ecological dynamics and functions that support life within and outside the places. Linked to biological diversity can be any of distinct human cultures that care for them and hold them sacred.

Sacred natural sites consist of all types of natural features including mountains, hills, forests, groves, rivers, lakes, lagoons, caves, islands and springs. They can vary in size from the very small: an individual tree, small spring, or a single rock formation, to whole landscapes and mountain ranges. They consist of geological formations, distinct landforms, specific ecosystems and natural habitats. They are predominantly terrestrial but are also found in inshore marine areas, islands and archipelagos. They may also be the location of temples, shrines, mosques and churches, and they can incorporate other features such as pilgrimage trails. In some sites nature is itself sacred, while in others sanctity is conferred by connections with spiritual heroes, religious structures or sacred histories.

== Religion ==
Sacred natural sites are just one of many domains where religions or belief systems interact with nature. Most if not all religions have mythology, cosmology, theology or ethics related to earth, nature and land. Contemporarily, such connections are increasingly being revived or rearticulated through ethical positions expressed for example in statements that many of the mainstream faiths have produced, setting out their relationship to the natural world and their responsibility towards the planet.

Sacred sites associated with living cultures may have institutions and rules associated with them. These institutions might be religious or spiritual in nature and may be distinct from other parts of society, while in some communities of indigenous and traditional peoples, sacred site institutions are closely integrated within society with little distinction between the sacred and secular, the religious and civil. However, there is a need to avoid romanticization of sacred natural sites as well. In some cases, sacred natural sites have been customarily regulated by taboos restricting the entry of particular marginalised social groups and women, thereby reifying the marginalization of these groups. Therefore, while evaluating the possibility of integrating traditional systems governing sacred natural sites with formal conservation approaches, parties need to be attentive to the ways in which social stratification plays into the ways in which these traditional systems function, so as to be sensitive to socio-economic equity.

Some sacred natural sites are connected to socio-cultural systems and institutions, some more complex than others, and to different dynamics of change and cultural interaction. Many sacred natural sites were founded by indigenous or folk religions and spiritualities, and many were subsequently adopted or co-opted by mainstream religions. There is consequently a considerable 'layering' and mixing of religious and other spiritual or belief systems. Within the larger mainstream religions there can be many autonomous or semi-autonomous sub-groups. While fifty per cent of the world's population profess to belong to either Christianity or Islam and many others are Hindus or Buddhists, 80 per cent of all people ascribe to a mainstream religion, a large part of which continue to adhere to at least some traditional or folk religion.

Within human history, religion has also been used (or abused) as a tool of domination. These issues, although much reduced, have not gone away and some faiths still seek converts from other faiths. The destruction of sacred sites has been part of that domination and still continues today. Conversely, most faiths over long periods of time have peaceably co-existed and shared sacred sites. Mutual respect and accommodation have often been reached. Further compassion and peace-building lie at the heart of many religious traditions and belief systems.

== Distribution ==
Sacred natural sites are, with the exception of Antarctica, found on every continent. Some of them are among the oldest venerated places of earth and at the same time new sacred natural sites are still being established, in some cases by migrants to new countries. Paleo-anthropological evidence indicates that earlier humans such as Neanderthals practised the cult of ancestors in burial sites over 60,000 years ago, which may be one of the origins of some sacred sites. Ancestor worship and veneration of burial grounds seem to be a common trait of every culture of modern humans, as well as the adoration of natural features of great significance such as high mountains or large rivers. Evidence indicates that certain Australian sacred sites may go back at least 50,000 years; rock art now considered of a sacred nature date to 20,000 years ago, and some of the Neolithic henges date from 5,000 years ago.

At a landscape level, anthropologists have long recognized the sacred status that cultures have given to nature not only in specific sacred sites, but also in larger areas of cultural significance and entire landscapes. Interest on the importance of sacred sites for living cultures has seen an upsurge since the mid-1990s, which has contributed to the exploration of new paradigms and multidisciplinary views to the advantage of both the understanding and conservation of sacred sites.

Because of their diversity, origins, and different and varying degrees of sacrality of their elements, it is not really possible to have full knowledge about the number of sacred sites existing in the world today. Exhaustively documenting sacred natural sites would have to be done by bottom-up identification at the community level, which is not really practicable. However, estimates have been made for some countries, notably India, where at least 13,720 sacred groves have been reported and experts estimate that the total number for the country may be in the range of 100,000 to 150,000. India may be exceptional because of its size, cultural diversity and widespread practices about sacred groves, but it would not be unrealistic to estimate that sacred natural sites must exist in the hundreds of thousands.

== Importance for the conservation of nature and culture ==
Many sacred natural sites have been protected over long time periods and have seen low levels of utilization. Some are demonstrably high in biodiversity and represent a biodiversity conservation opportunity. Sacred natural sites also represent ancient cultural values. The roles of sacred sites' custodians from indigenous, local community and mainstream religions are expressions of efforts that cultures have made to care for nature in various ways.

While sacred natural sites are connected to the human spirit and intangible heritage they also have strong material components. In addition to being places where animals and plant species survive, they can provide resources such as water and medicines and other ecosystem services, they sometimes are the location of events and ceremonies, and may be traditional sites of education. Some support pilgrimages and tourism, both of which have large associated service sectors and generate significant economic activity.

== A brief history in conservation ==
Following a seminal workshop organized by UNESCO in 1998, international conservation organisations like WWF and IUCN, working with indigenous groups and networks such as the Rigoberta Menchu Tum Foundation, started to explore ways to integrate sacred natural sites in their conservation work. A number of international events and colloquy followed, and case studies and scientific and practitioner articles started to appear in books and journals.

In the context of academic study and development of sacred natural sites, the concept of free prior, informed consent (FPIC) has emerged as a standard for engaging with the relevant indigenous people and local communities. For many custodians of sacred natural sites, secrecy is of the utmost importance and may warrant serious consideration and respect. At the same time it needs to be recognised that research and inventory can be powerful tools for the communication and conservation of sacred natural sites.

In 2003, IUCN's Specialist Group on the Cultural and Spiritual Values of Protected Areas (CSVPA) and UNESCO started work on guidelines for the management of sacred natural sites. This Group has advanced a significant amount of work on sacred natural sites, including through specific projects such as the Delos Initiative. Among international conservation NGOs, The Nature Conservancy has developed a planning tool for the conservation of sacred sites and cultural heritage in protected areas and tested it across countries in Central America such as Honduras, El Salvador, Mexico and Guatemala. WWF studied sacred sites in one hundred protected areas. ICIMOD developed a framework to systematically assess the cultural ecosystem services of sacred natural sites, so as to facilitate their inclusion in formal conservation planning in the countries with the mountainous Himalaya and Hindu Kush regions.

== International importance ==
An urgent need for the protection of sacred natural sites was recognized by the Convention on Biological Diversity (CBD) and the UN Permanent Forum on Indigenous Issues. The CBD in 2004 developed the Akwe Kon voluntary guidelines for the conduct of cultural, environmental and social impact assessments regarding proposed developments that may affect sacred sites and on lands and waters traditionally occupied or used by indigenous and local communities.

At the political level, the adoption of the United Nations Declaration on the Rights of Indigenous Peoples is an important benchmark. Article 12 in particular provides significant political leverage for developing appropriate policies for the protection and recognition of sacred natural sites at the national level. It states: "Indigenous peoples have the right to manifest, practice, develop and teach their spiritual and religious traditions, customs and ceremonies; the right to maintain, protect, and have access in privacy to their religious and cultural sites; the right to the use and control of their ceremonial objects; and the right to the repatriation of their human remains."

== Global change ==
Verschuuren et al. (2010) identified significant global changes, many of which affect sacred natural sites and their custodian communities. These include:

- global human population increase,
- modernity and erosion of traditional culture,
- biodiversity loss, habitat and species declines, species extinction and ecosystem damage,
- industrialization of agriculture, forestry, fisheries or other types of land and sea use,
- extractive and energy industries,
- growth of cities, urbanization and transport networks,
- increased conflict over natural resources,
- weakened livelihood systems and poverty,
- social and political changes and conflicts in the geopolitical realm,
- globalization of the dominant economic model based on continual growth, detached from ecological realities,
- decline in spiritual values,
- climate change.

Many of the drivers of these global changes are mutually reinforcing and affect cultural and biological diversity and the many services that sacred natural sites provide to human well-being.

Generating a greater recognition of the sacred dimensions of nature focused on sacred natural sites is expected to be an important means of building public support for the policies that conserve biodiversity, ecosystem services, and the diversity of human adaptations to a changing environment.

== Gallery ==
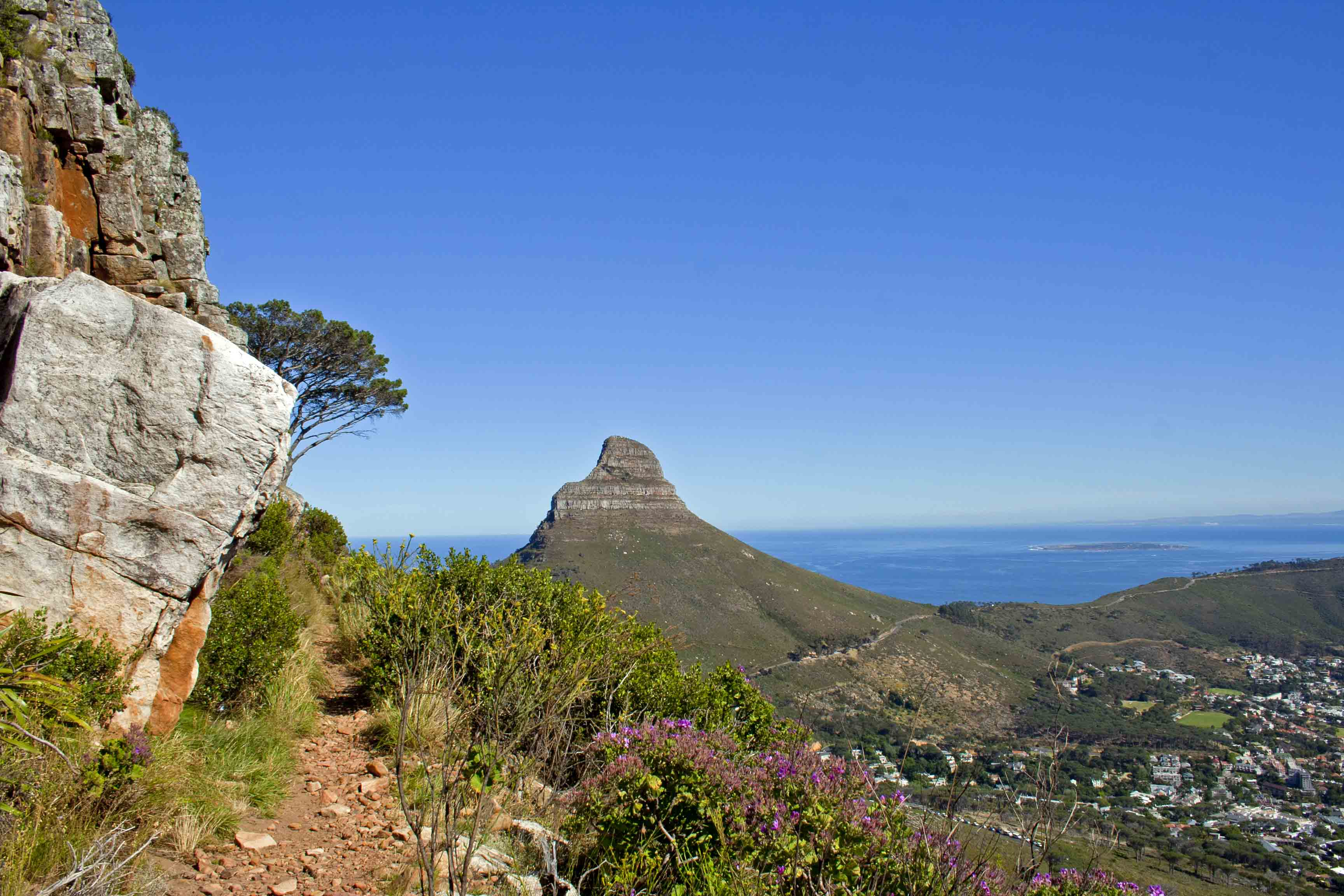
Lion's Head, Cape Town, South Africa

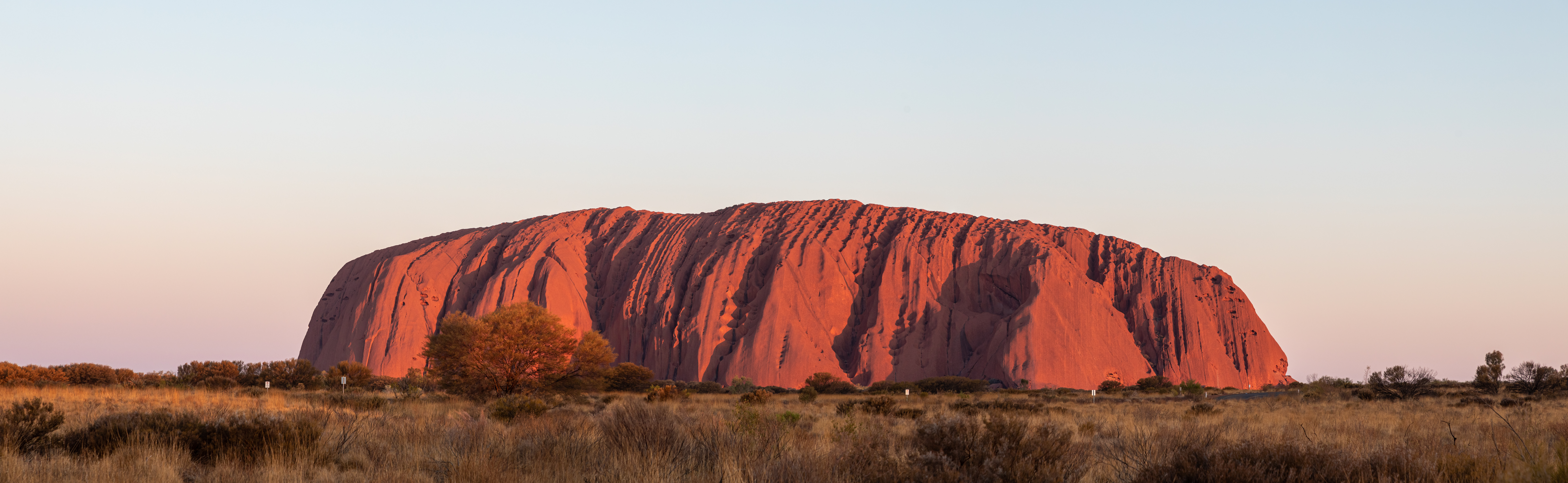
Uluru in Northern Territory, Australia

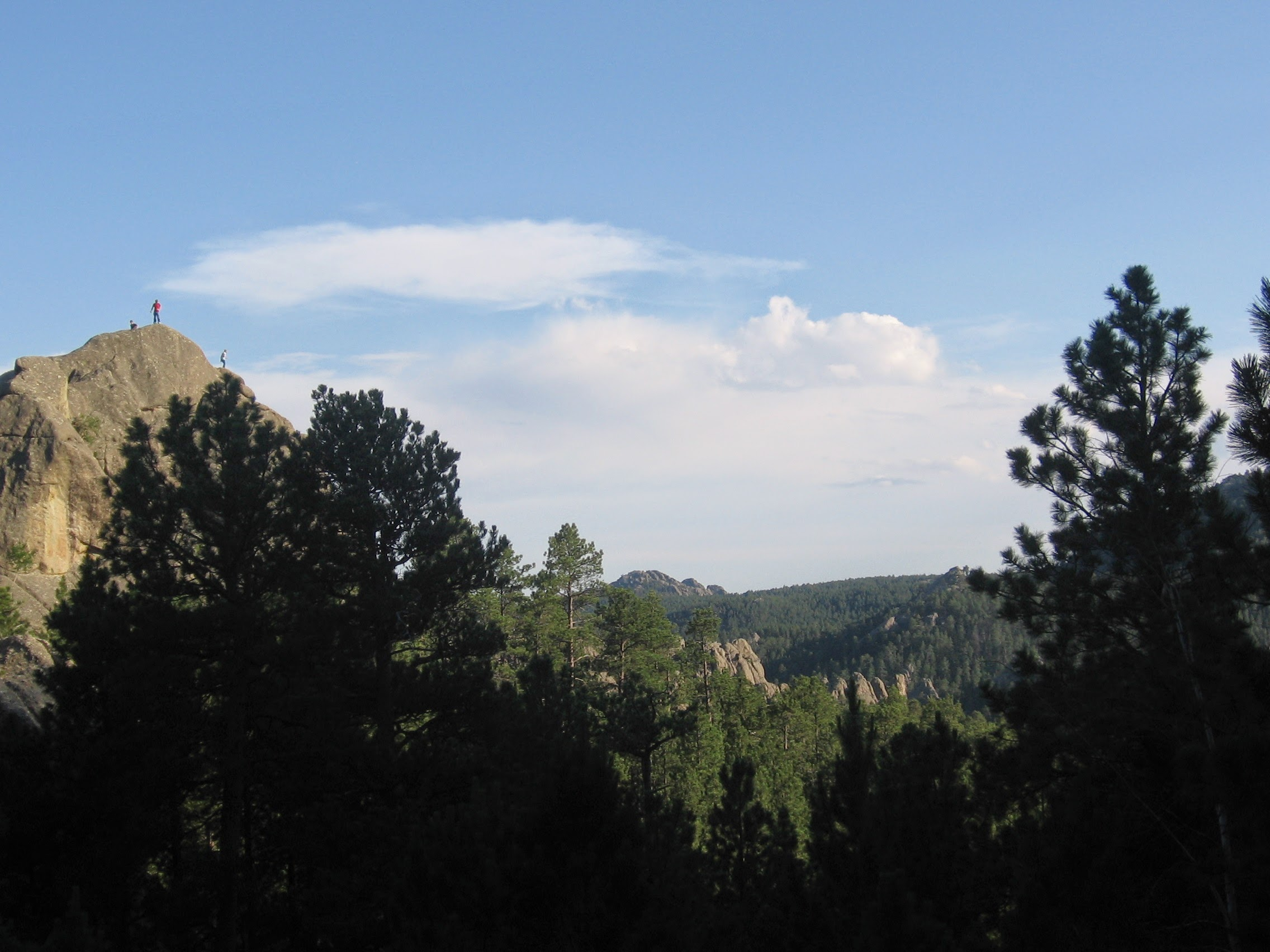
Black Hills in South Dakota, United States

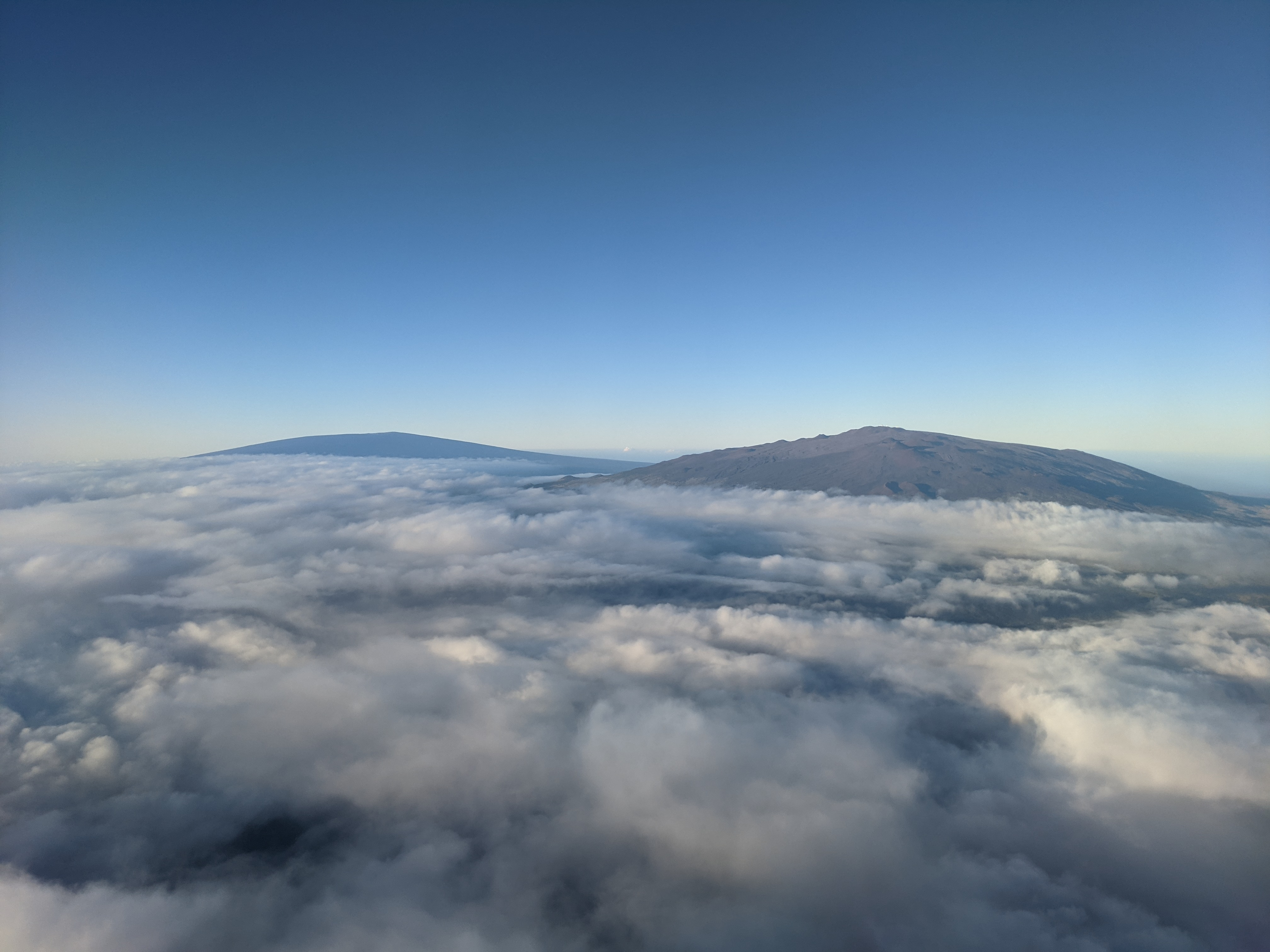
Mauna Kea and Mauna Loa in Hawaii, United States

Mount Fuji in Honshu, Japan

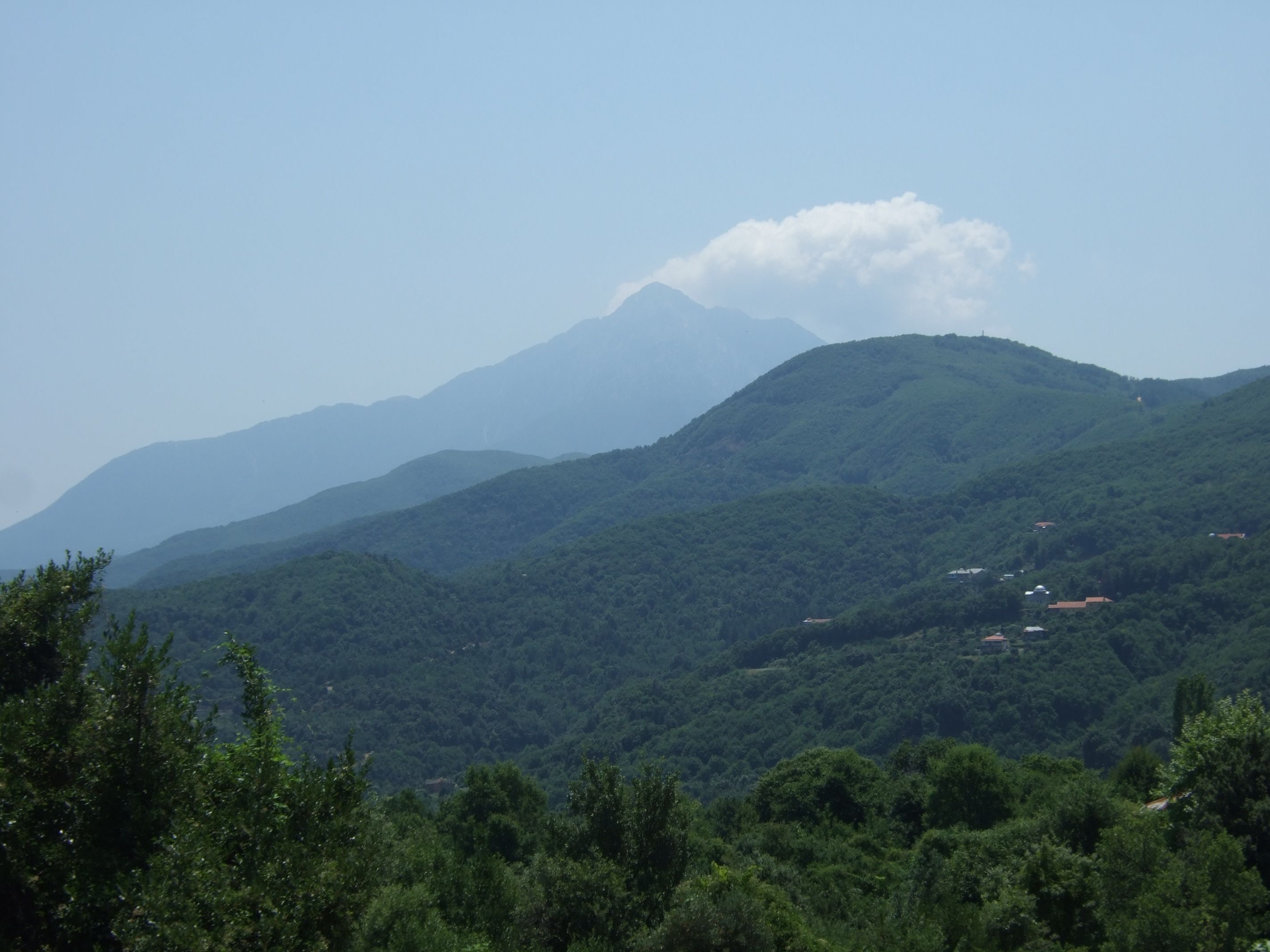
Mount Athos in Greece

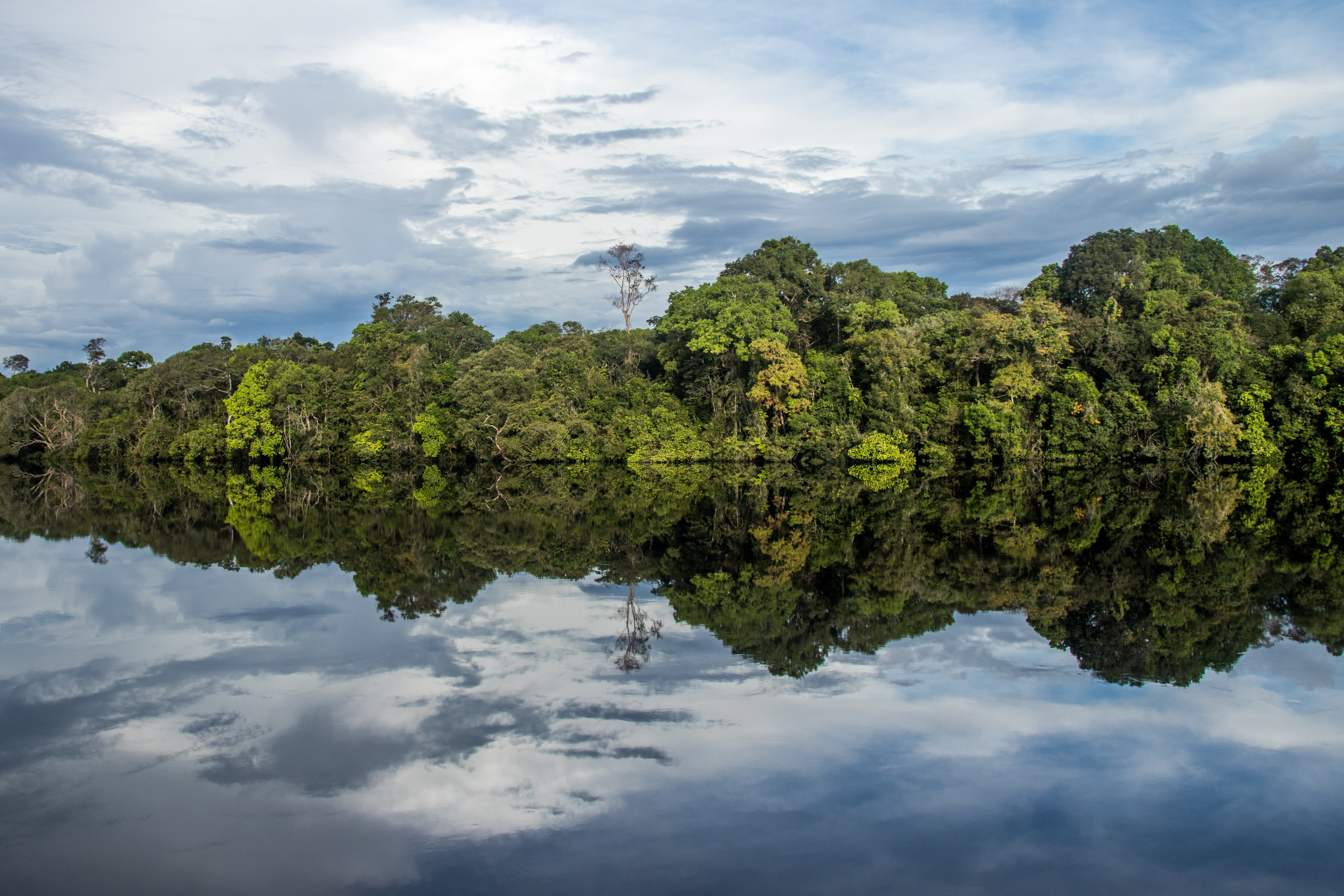
Jaú National Park in Amazon rainforest of Brazil

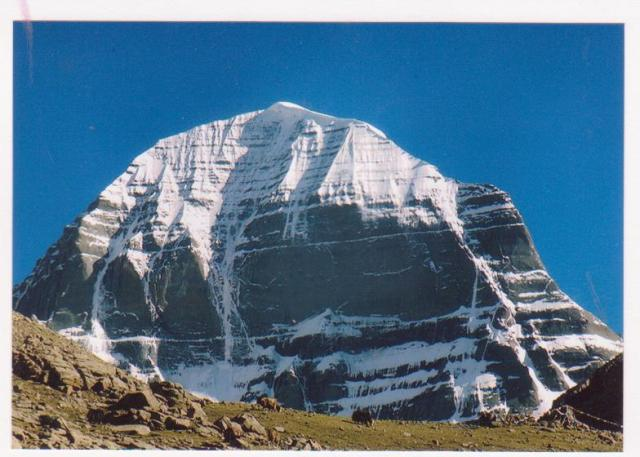
Mount Kailash in Tibet, China

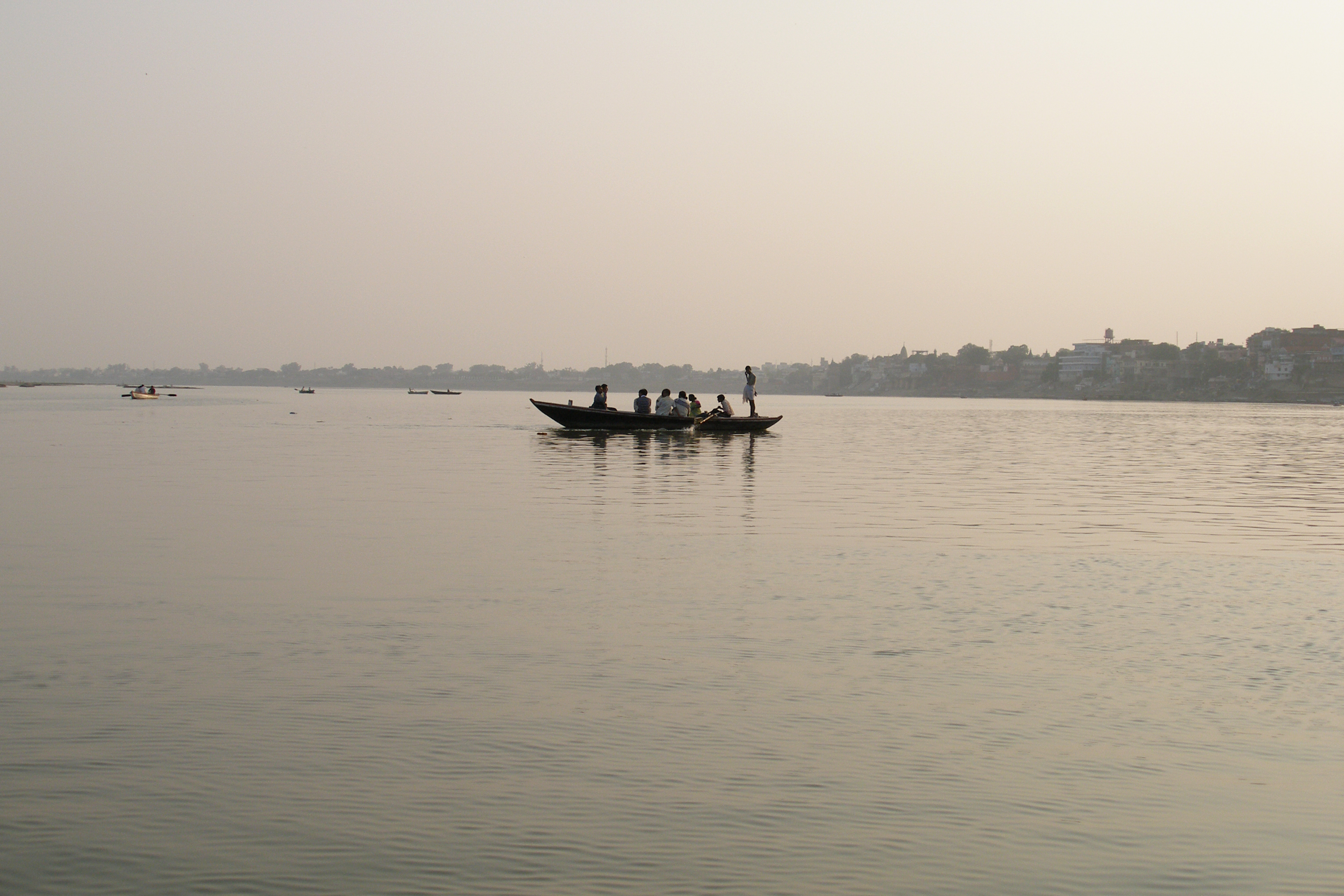
Ganges River in Varanasi, India

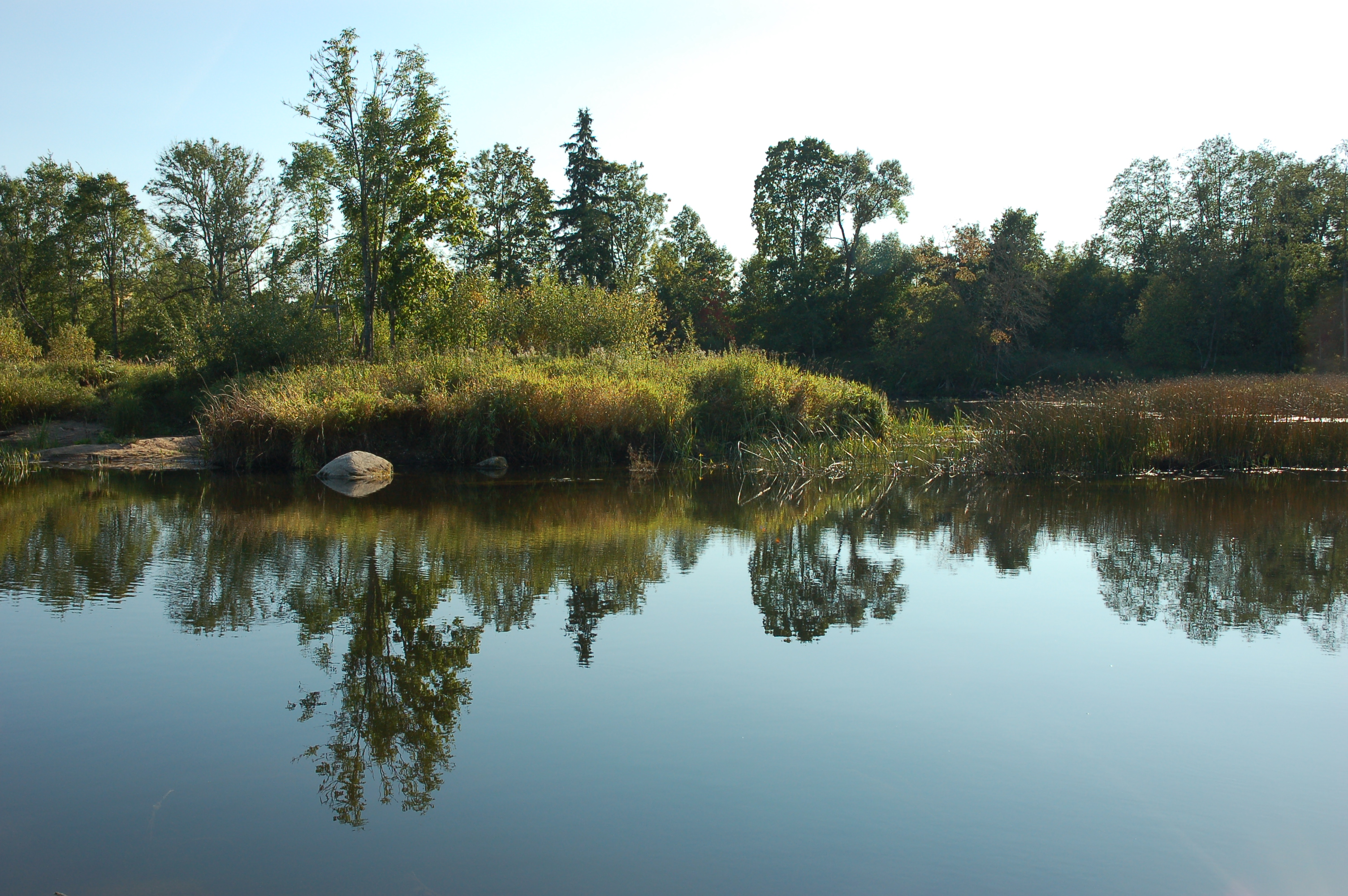
Sacred grove island of Tori, Estonia

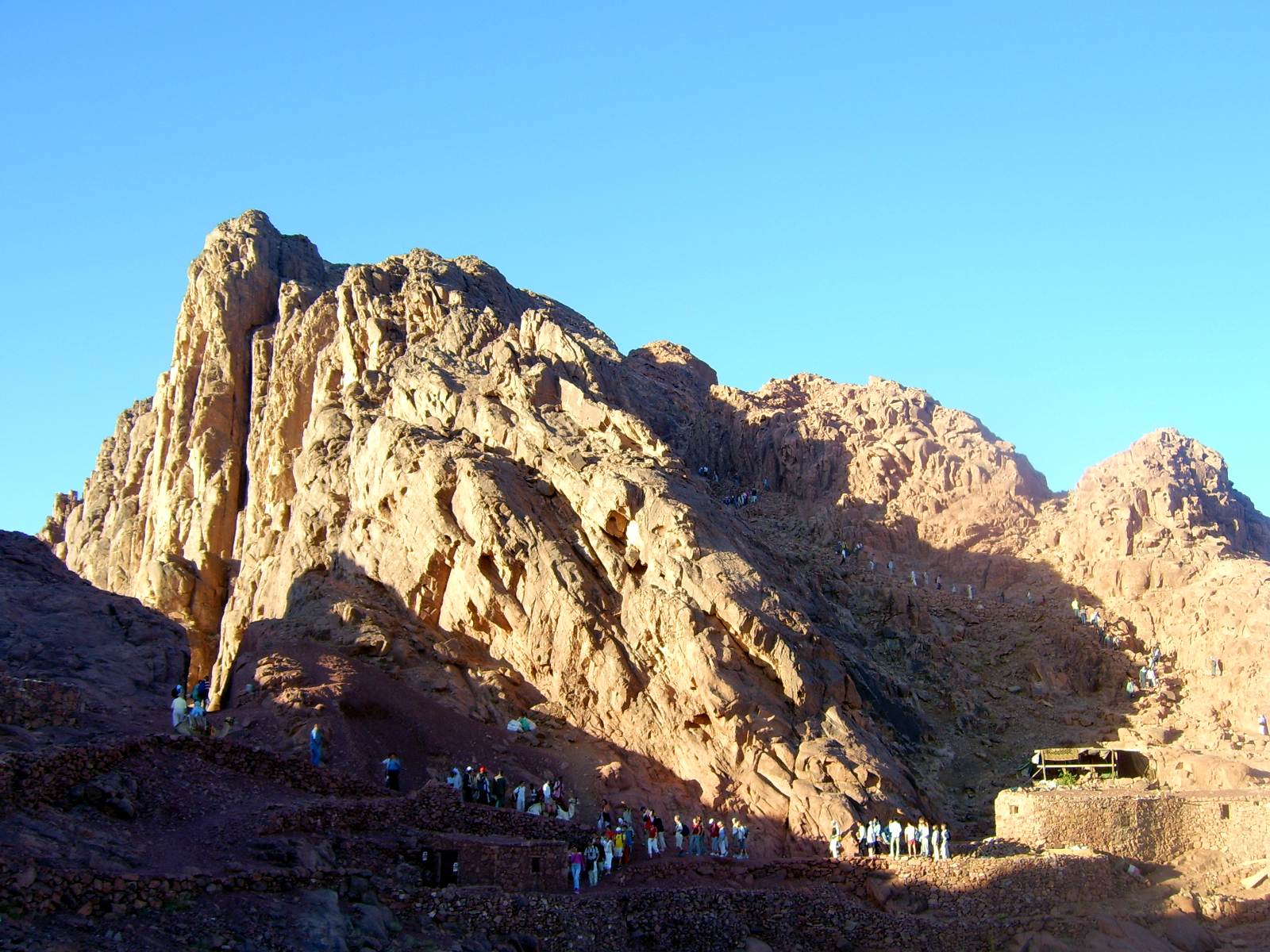
Mount Sinai in Sinai Peninsula, Egypt

== See also ==
- Sacred trees
  - Bodhi Tree
  - Largest Banyan trees
  - Sacred groves
  - Sacred groves of India
  - Trees in mythology
  - Tree worship
- Australian Aboriginal sacred sites
- Sacred mountains
- Sacred waters
- Sacred rivers
- Sacred site
  - Axis mundi
  - Earth mysteries
  - Liminal spaces
  - Numinous
