= Tjayanka Woods =

Australian artist (born c. 1935)

- Born: c. 1935; Kaḻayapiṯi, South Australia
- Occupations: Painter, weaver
- Years active: 2000–present
- Organization(s): Irrunytju Arts; Papulankutja Artists
- Style: Western Desert art

Tjayanka Woods is an Australian Aboriginal artist. She was one of the pioneers of the art movement across the Ngaanyatjarra, Pitjantjatjara and Yankunytjatjara lands, which began in 2000. She is best known for her paintings, but also a craftswoman who makes baskets and other woven artworks. Her paintings are held in the Art Gallery of Western Australia, National Gallery of Victoria, and the National Gallery of Australia.

Woods was born about 1935. She was born close to Kaḻayapiṯi, a rock hole in the Great Victoria Desert of South Australia. She grew up living a traditional, nomadic way of life in the bush with her family, before any contact with Euro-Australian society. They often camped at Kaḻayapiṯi, and Woods and the other girls would gather bushfood together. She learned to carve basic tools and decorative objects, and to burn traditional patterns into the wood (this is called puṉu. She also learned to spin hair string on a hand-spun spindle and weave head rings and ceremonial belts from hair and feathers.

Woods began painting in 2000, after moving to Irrunytju. The women there opened an art centre as a community-owned economic project, called Irrunytju Arts. From the beginning of her career, Brown often painted with her friend Anmanari Brown. When Brown's husband died in 2007, the two women left Irrunytju and went to live at Papulankutja, on Ngaanyatjarra lands. Here, they painted for Papulankutja Artists. In April 2010, the two women held their first solo exhibition together at the Vivien Anderson Gallery in Melbourne. Woods has had two of her paintings chosen as finalists for the National Aboriginal & Torres Strait Islander Art Award, in 2006 and 2008.

Woods' paintings are mostly about the Minyma Kutjara Tjukurpa (Two Sisters Dreaming), which is her personal Dreaming. They are structured like maps drawn in the sand, tracing the journey of the two sisters around the edge of the canvas. She paints in earthy colours, and uses solid and dotted lines in concentric circles to depict the journeys and activities of figures in the story.
