= Sacred space =

Locations of religious significance

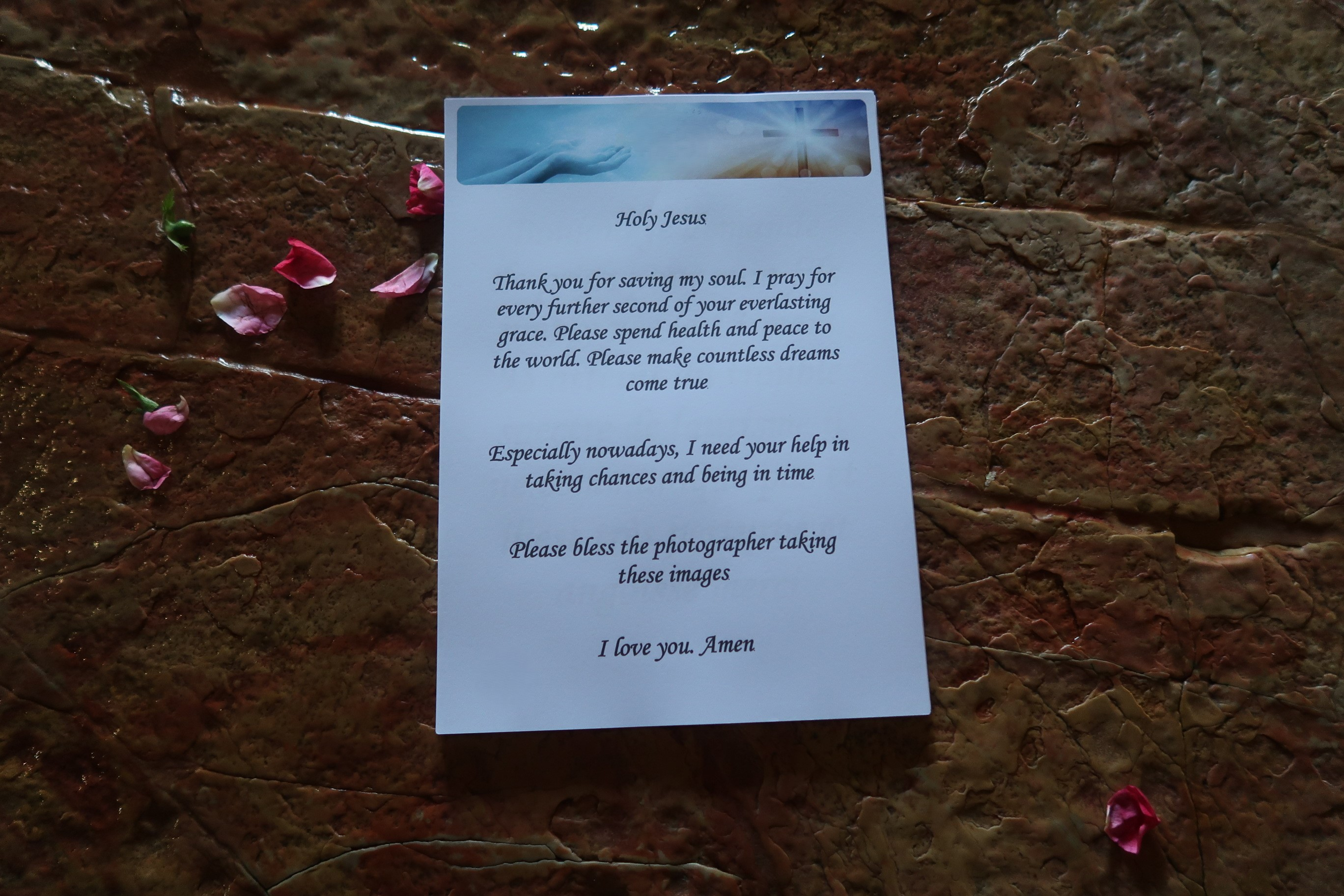
Stone of Unction in the Church of the Holy Sepulchre, Jerusalem, with placed prayer and flower petals

A sacred place or holy site (Note: Also called a sacred ground, sacred temple, holy ground, or holy place.) is a location which is regarded to be sacred or hallowed. The sacredness of a natural feature may accrue through tradition or be granted through a blessing. One or more religions may consider sacred locations to be of special significance. Often, such locations either are or become the home of sanctuaries, shrines, places of worship, or locations conducive to meditation. Regardless of construction or use, these areas may have a variety of ritual or taboo associations – including limitations on visitors or on allowed actions within the space. Such places may become the focus of pilgrimage, drawing pilgrims from great distances, or simply locations of significance for the local populace. It is asserted by scholars of religion that "the sacred space is the place where the transcendent becomes immanent, and where the devotee can access God."

A sacred space is a designated area, often marked by physical boundaries or symbols, that is considered holy or consecrated by a particular religion or culture. These spaces can be natural or man-made, and their significance varies widely across different traditions. They serve as places of worship, pilgrimage, meditation, or simply as a reminder of a sacred event or being. The concept of a sacred space is deeply rooted in human spirituality and has been a central feature of religious practices for millennia.

As described in the Bible's Book of Exodus, Moses was instructed to remove his shoes before approaching the burning bush, as the ground was considered holy. This act symbolizes the reverence and respect that should be shown in sacred spaces. Mircea Eliade argues that while the concept of a sacred space is often associated with religious traditions, it is not exclusive to them. Secular societies may also designate certain places as sacred due to their historical, cultural, or natural significance.

== Examples ==
Types of sacred places include:

- Australian Aboriginal sacred sites
- Sacred groves (such as those in India or in Germanic cultures)
- Sacred mountains
- Sacred trees
- Sacred waters
- Tombs

Specific sacred places include:

- The Holy Land
- Ise Shrine
- The Western Wall
- Temple Mount
- The Mahabodhi Temple
- The Church of the Holy Sepulchre
- Mount of Olives
- Yazd Atash Behram
- The Cave of the Patriarchs in Hebron
- Sapta Puri
- Tirupati

== See also ==
- Tirtha (Hinduism)
- Trees in mythology
- Tree worship
  - Axis mundi
  - Earth mysteries
  - Hierotopy
  - Liminality § In places
  - Numen
  - Sanctum sanctorum
- Place of worship
- Sacred–profane dichotomy
  - Sacred architecture
