= Iyer (disambiguation) =

Iyers are people from the Indian iyer caste. It may also refer to:

== People ==
=== Surname ===
- A. Vaidyanatha Iyer
- Akhil Iyer
- Alathur Srinivasa Iyer
- Alladi Krishnaswamy Iyer
- Anirudh Iyer
- Anuja Iyer
- Apsara Iyer
- Bhavani Iyer
- C. P. Ramaswami Iyer
- C. R. Pattabhirama Iyer
- Chamundeswari Iyer
- Chitra Iyer
- Chokila Iyer
- Divya S. Iyer
- F. G. Natesa Iyer
- G. Rama Iyer
- G. Subramania Iyer
- G. V. Iyer
- Gayathiri Iyer
- Gayatri Iyer
- Harish Iyer
- K. Seshadri Iyer
- Kalpana Iyer
- Kannan Iyer
- Koteeswara Iyer
- Krish Iyer
- Krishna Iyer
- Kumar Iyer
- L. K. Ananthakrishna Iyer
- Lars Iyer
- Madhu Iyer
- Madurai Mani Iyer
- Maha Vaidyanatha Iyer
- Mahalakshmi Iyer
- Malini Iyer
- Malvika Iyer
- Musiri Subramania Iyer
- Naresh Iyer
- Nehalaxmi Iyer
- P. S. Sivaswami Iyer
- Palghat Mani Iyer
- Parameswaran Iyer
- Parur Sundaram Iyer
- Patnam Subramania Iyer
- Pennathur Subramania Iyer
- Pico Iyer
- Raghavan Iyer (chef)
- Raghavan N. Iyer
- Ravishankar K. Iyer
- Regret Iyer
- Roopa Iyer
- S. Ganesa Iyer
- S. N. N. Sankaralinga Iyer
- S. Ramachandra Iyer
- S. Subramania Iyer
- Sairam Iyer
- Sangita Iyer
- Sethurama Iyer
- Shreyas Iyer
- Shriram Iyer
- Sowmya Sathyanarayana Iyer
- Sriya Iyer
- S. Subramania Iyer
- Subramanian Iyer
- Thanya Iyer
- U. V. Swaminatha Iyer
- Usha Iyer
- V. Krishnaswamy Iyer
- V. R. Krishna Iyer
- V. S. Subramanya Iyer
- Venkatesh Iyer
- Vijay Iyer
- Zanani Iyer

=== Given name ===
- Iyer Sanjog

=== Middle name ===
- Ashwiny Iyer Tiwari
- Tirunellai Narayana Iyer Seshan

== Other ==
- Mr. and Mrs. Iyer
- Iyer in Arabia
- Iyer the Great
- Sethurama Iyer CBI
- List of Iyers
- Mani Iyer
