= Sayram =

Sayram or Sairam may refer to:

== Places ==
- Sayram (city), city in South Kazakhstan Province, Kazakhstan
- Sayram District, district of South Kazakhstan Province, Kazakhstan
- Sayram Lake, in Bortala Mongol Autonomous Prefecture, Xinjiang, China
- Sayram, Xinjiang, town in Baicheng County, Xinjiang, China
- Sayran Lake, an urban lake in the western part of Almaty, Kazakhstan

== People ==
- Hüseyin Sayram (1905–1988), Turkish politician
- Sairam Isaeva, Tajik actress
- Sairam Iyer, Indian singer
- Sairam Shankar, Indian actor
