= Animism =

Class of religious beliefs

Animism (from Latin: anima, meaning 'breath', 'spirit', or 'life') is the worldview or perception that various types of natural phenomena, including non-human organisms and often even landforms and inanimate objects, possess distinct spiritual essences, souls, or personhood. Animism assumes a wide view about which entities may be considered animate, thus typically perceiving animals, plants, rivers, weather systems, and other natural entities, plus in some cases human handiwork and words, as all having some degree of agency, life, and will. Animism is used in anthropology of religion as a term for the religion of many indigenous peoples in contrast to the relatively more recent development of organized religions.

Although each culture has its own mythologies and rituals, animism is said to describe the most common, foundational thread of indigenous peoples' "spiritual" or "supernatural" perspectives. The animistic perspective is so widely held and inherent to most indigenous peoples that they often do not even have a word in their languages that corresponds to "animism" (or even "religion"). The term "animism" is an anthropological construct. A 2016 comparative study found that the oldest religious belief, present in the most recent common ancestor of hunter-gatherer groups, was animism, which would influence the later development of human religions in unseen forces, realms and spiritual beings.

Largely due to such ethnolinguistic and cultural discrepancies, opinions differ on whether animism refers to an ancestral mode of experience common to indigenous peoples around the world or to a full-fledged religion in its own right. The accepted definition of animism was developed only in the late 19th century (1871) by Edward Tylor. It is "one of anthropology's earliest concepts, if not the first".

Animism encompasses beliefs that all material phenomena have agency, that there exists no categorical distinction between the spiritual and physical world, and that soul, spirit, or sentience exists not only in humans but also in other animals, plants, rocks, geographic features (such as mountains and rivers), and other entities of the natural environment. Examples include water spirits, vegetation deities, and tree spirits, among others. Animism may further attribute a life force to abstract concepts such as words, true names, or metaphors in mythology. Some members of the non-tribal world also consider themselves animists, such as author Daniel Quinn, sculptor Lawson Oyekan, and many neopagans.

== Etymology ==
English anthropologist Sir Edward Tylor initially wanted to describe the phenomenon as spiritualism, but he realized that it would cause confusion with the modern religion of spiritualism, which was then prevalent across Western nations. He adopted the term animism from the writings of German scientist Georg Ernst Stahl, who had developed the term animismus in 1708 as a biological theory that souls formed the vital principle, and that the normal phenomena of life and the abnormal phenomena of disease could be traced to spiritual causes.

The word originates from the Latin word anima, meaning "life" or "soul".'

The first known usage in English appeared in 1819.

== "Old animism" definitions ==
Earlier anthropological perspectives, which have since been termed the old animism, were concerned with knowledge on what is alive and what factors make something alive. The old animism assumed that animists were individuals who were unable to understand the difference between persons and things. Critics of the old animism have accused it of preserving "colonialist and dualistic worldviews and rhetoric."

=== Edward Tylor's definition ===
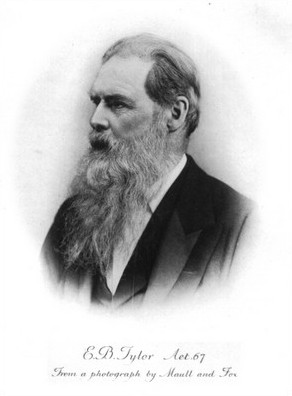
Edward Tylor developed animism as an anthropological theory.

The idea of animism was developed by anthropologist Sir Edward Tylor through his 1871 book Primitive culture, in which he defined it as "the general doctrine of souls and other spiritual beings in general". According to Tylor, animism often includes "an idea of pervading life and will in nature"; a belief that natural objects other than humans have souls. This formulation was little different from that proposed by Auguste Comte as "fetishism", but the terms now have distinct meanings.

For Tylor, animism represented the earliest form of religion, situated within an evolutionary framework of religion that has developed in stages and which will ultimately lead to humanity rejecting religion altogether in favor of scientific rationality. Thus, for Tylor, animism was fundamentally seen as a mistake, a basic error from which all religions grew. He did not believe that animism was inherently illogical; he suggested that it arose from early humans' dreams and visions and thus was a rational system. However, it was based on erroneous, unscientific observations about the nature of reality. Stringer notes that his reading of Primitive Culture led him to believe that Tylor was far more sympathetic regarding "primitive" populations than many of his contemporaries and that Tylor expressed no belief that there was any difference between the intellectual capabilities of "savage" people and Westerners.

The idea that there had once been "one universal form of primitive religion" (whether labelled animism, totemism, or shamanism) has been dismissed as "unsophisticated" and "erroneous" by archaeologist Timothy Insoll, who stated that "it removes complexity, a precondition of religion now, in all its variants."

=== Social evolutionist conceptions ===
Tylor's definition of animism was part of a growing international debate on the nature of "primitive society" by lawyers, theologians, and philologists. The debate defined the field of research of a new science: anthropology. By the end of the 19th century, an orthodoxy on "primitive society" had emerged, but few anthropologists still would accept that definition. The "19th-century armchair anthropologists" argued that "primitive society" (an evolutionary category) was ordered by kinship and divided into exogamous descent groups related by a series of marriage exchanges. Their religion was animism, the belief that natural species and objects had souls.

With the development of private property, the descent groups were displaced by the emergence of the territorial state. These rituals and beliefs eventually evolved over time into the vast array of "developed" religions. According to Tylor, as society became more scientifically advanced, fewer members of that society would believe in animism. However, any remnant ideologies of souls or spirits, to Tylor, represented "survivals" of the original animism of early humanity.

The term ["animism"] clearly began as an expression of a nest of insulting approaches to indigenous peoples and the earliest putatively religious humans. It was, and sometimes remains, a colonialist slur.

— Graham Harvey, 2005.

=== Confounding animism with totemism ===
In 1869 (three years after Tylor proposed his definition of animism), Edinburgh lawyer John Ferguson McLennan, argued that the animistic thinking evident in fetishism gave rise to a religion he named totemism. Primitive people believed, he argued, that they were descended from the same species as their totemic animal. Subsequent debate by the "armchair anthropologists" (including J. J. Bachofen, Émile Durkheim, and Sigmund Freud) remained focused on totemism rather than animism, with few directly challenging Tylor's definition. Anthropologists "have commonly avoided the issue of animism and even the term itself, rather than revisit this prevalent notion in light of their new and rich ethnographies."

According to anthropologist Tim Ingold, animism shares similarities with totemism but differs in its focus on individual spirit beings which help to perpetuate life, whereas totemism more typically holds that there is a primary source, such as the land itself or the ancestors, who provide the basis to life. Certain indigenous religious groups such as the Aboriginal Australians are more typically totemic in their worldview, whereas others like the Inuit are more typically animistic.

== "New animism" definitions ==
Many anthropologists ceased using the term animism, deeming it to be too close to early anthropological theory and religious polemic. However, the term had also been claimed by religious groups—namely, Indigenous communities and people who worship naturepers—who felt that it aptly described their own beliefs, and who in some cases actively identified as "animists." It was thus readopted by various scholars, who began using the term in a different way, placing the focus on knowing how to behave toward other beings, some of whom are not human. As religious studies scholar Graham Harvey stated, while the "old animist" definition had been problematic, the term animism was nevertheless "of considerable value as a critical, academic term for a style of religious and cultural relating to the world."

=== Hallowell and the Ojibwe ===
The new animism emerged largely from the publications of anthropologist Irving Hallowell, produced on the basis of his ethnographic research among the Ojibwe the mid-20th century. For the Ojibwe encountered by Hallowell, personhood did not require human-likeness, but rather humans were perceived as being like other persons, who for instance included rock persons and bear persons. For the Ojibwe, these persons were each willful beings, who gained meaning and power through their interactions with others; through respectfully interacting with other persons, they themselves learned to "act as a person."

Hallowell's approach to the understanding of Ojibwe personhood differed strongly from prior anthropological concepts of animism. He emphasized the need to challenge the modernist, Western perspectives of what a person is, by entering into a dialogue with different worldwide views. Hallowell's approach influenced the work of anthropologist Nurit Bird-David, who produced a scholarly article reassessing the idea of animism in 1999. Seven comments from other academics were provided in the journal, debating Bird-David's ideas.

=== Postmodern anthropology ===
More recently, postmodern anthropologists are increasingly engaging with the concept of animism. Modernism is characterized by a Cartesian subject-object dualism that divides the subjective from the objective, and culture from nature. In the modernist view, animism is the inverse of scientism, and hence, is deemed inherently invalid by some anthropologists. Drawing on the work of Bruno Latour, some anthropologists question modernist assumptions and theorize that all societies continue to "animate" the world around them. In contrast to Tylor's reasoning, however, this "animism" is considered to be more than just a remnant of primitive thought. More specifically, the "animism" of modernity is characterized by humanity's "professional subcultures", as in the ability to treat the world as a detached entity within a delimited sphere of activity.

Human beings continue to create personal relationships with elements of the aforementioned objective world, such as pets, cars, or teddy bears, which are recognized as subjects. As such, these entities are "approached as communicative subjects rather than the inert objects perceived by modernists." These approaches aim to avoid the modernist assumption that the environment consists of a physical world distinct from the world of humans, as well as the modernist conception of the person being composed dualistically of a body and a soul.

Nurit Bird-David argues that:

Positivistic ideas about the meaning of 'nature', 'life', and 'personhood' misdirected these previous attempts to understand the local concepts. Classical theoreticians (it is argued) attributed their own modernist ideas of self to 'primitive peoples' while asserting that the 'primitive peoples' read their idea of self into others!

She explains that animism is a "relational epistemology" rather than a failure of primitive reasoning. That is, self-identity among animists is based on their relationships with others, rather than any distinctive features of the "self". Instead of focusing on the essentialized, modernist self (the "individual"), persons are viewed as bundles of social relationships ("dividuals"), some of which include "superpersons" (i.e. non-humans).

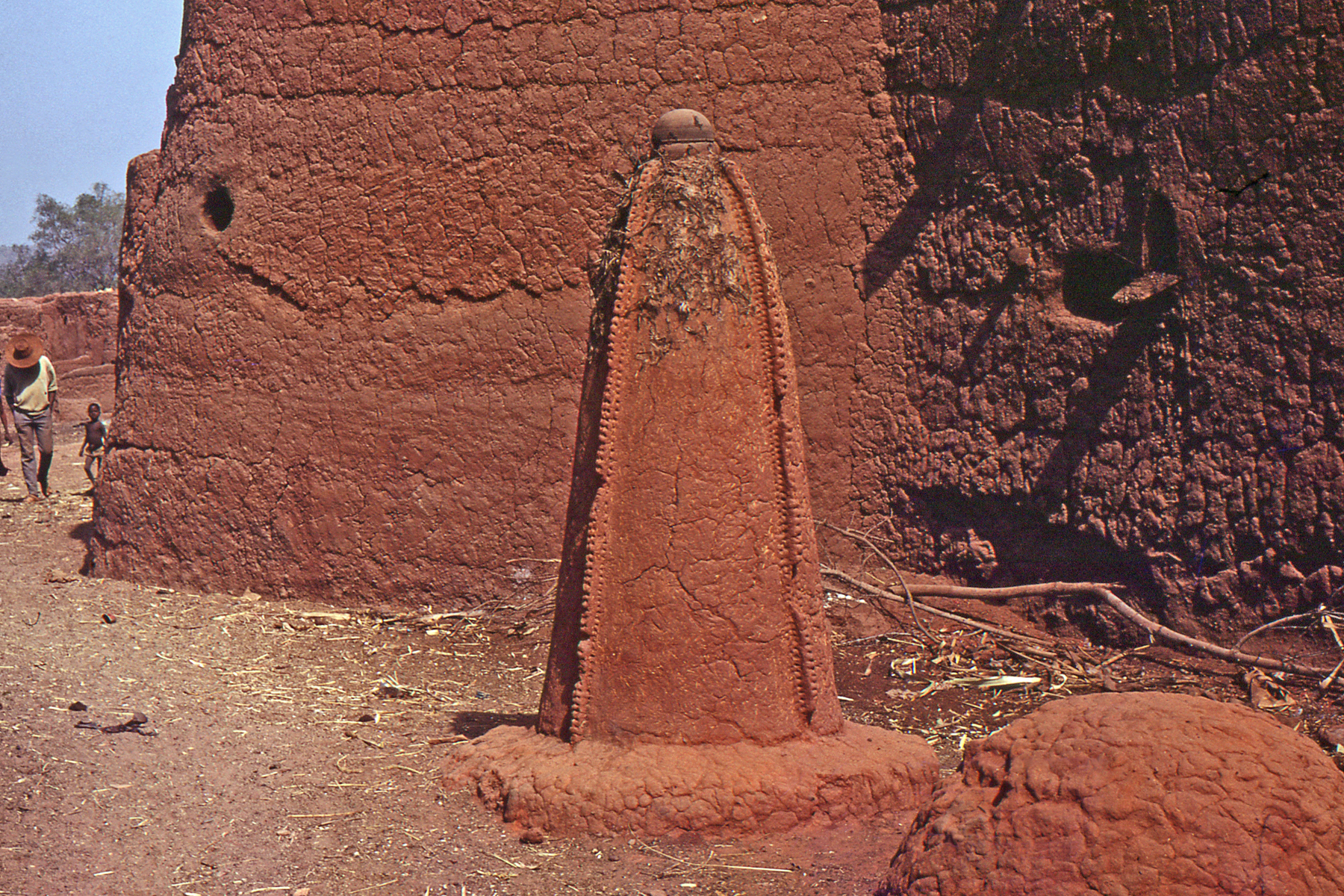
Animist altar, Bozo village, Mopti, Bandiagara, Mali, in 1972

Stewart Guthrie expressed criticism of Bird-David's attitude towards animism, believing that it promulgated the view that "the world is in large measure whatever our local imagination makes it." This, he felt, would result in anthropology abandoning "the scientific project."

Like Bird-David, Tim Ingold argues that animists do not see themselves as separate from their environment:

Hunter-gatherers do not, as a rule, approach their environment as an external world of nature that has to be 'grasped' intellectually ... indeed the separation of mind and nature has no place in their thought and practice.

Rane Willerslev extends the argument by noting that animists reject this Cartesian dualism and that the animist self identifies with the world, "feeling at once within and apart from it so that the two glide ceaselessly in and out of each other in a sealed circuit". The animist hunter is thus aware of himself as a human hunter, but, through mimicry, is able to assume the viewpoint, senses, and sensibilities of his prey, to be one with it. Shamanism, in this view, is an everyday attempt to influence spirits of ancestors and animals, by mirroring their behaviors, as the hunter does its prey.

=== Ethical and ecological understanding ===
Cultural ecologist and philosopher David Abram proposed an ethical and ecological understanding of animism, grounded in the phenomenology of sensory experience. In his books The Spell of the Sensuous and Becoming Animal, Abram suggests that material things are never entirely passive in our direct perceptual experience, holding rather that perceived things actively "solicit our attention" or "call our focus", coaxing the perceiving body into an ongoing participation with those things.

In the absence of intervening technologies, he suggests that sensory experience is inherently animistic in that it discloses a material field that is animate and self-organizing from the beginning. David Abram used contemporary cognitive and natural science, as well as the perspectival worldviews of diverse indigenous oral cultures, to propose a richly pluralist and story-based cosmology in which matter is alive. He suggested that such a relational ontology is in close accord with humanity's spontaneous perceptual experience by drawing attention to the senses, and to the primacy of sensuous terrain, enjoining a more respectful and ethical relation to the more-than-human community of animals, plants, soils, mountains, waters, and weather-patterns that materially sustains humanity.

In contrast to a long-standing tendency in the Western social sciences, which commonly provides rational explanations of animistic experience, Abram develops an animistic account of reason itself. He holds that civilised reason is sustained only by intensely animistic participation between human beings and their own written signs. For instance, as soon as someone reads letters on a page or screen, they can "see what it says"—the letters speak as much as nature spoke to pre-literate peoples. Reading can usefully be understood as an intensely concentrated form of animism, one that effectively eclipses all of the other, older, more spontaneous forms of animistic participation in which humans were once engaged.

To tell the story in this manner—to provide an animistic account of reason, rather than the other way around—is to imply that animism is the wider and more inclusive term and that oral, mimetic modes of experience still underlie, and support, all our literate and technological modes of reflection. When reflection's rootedness in such bodily, participatory modes of experience is entirely unacknowledged or unconscious, reflective reason becomes dysfunctional, unintentionally destroying the corporeal, sensuous world that sustains it.

=== Relation to the concept of 'I-thou' ===
Religious studies scholar Graham Harvey defined animism as the belief "that the world is full of persons, only some of whom are human, and that life is always lived in relationship with others." He added that it is therefore "concerned with learning how to be a good person in respectful relationships with other persons."

In his Handbook of Contemporary Animism (2013), Harvey identifies the animist perspective in line with Martin Buber's "I-thou" as opposed to "I-it". In such, Harvey says, the animist takes an I-thou approach to relating to the world, whereby objects and animals are treated as a "thou", rather than as an "it".

== Religion ==
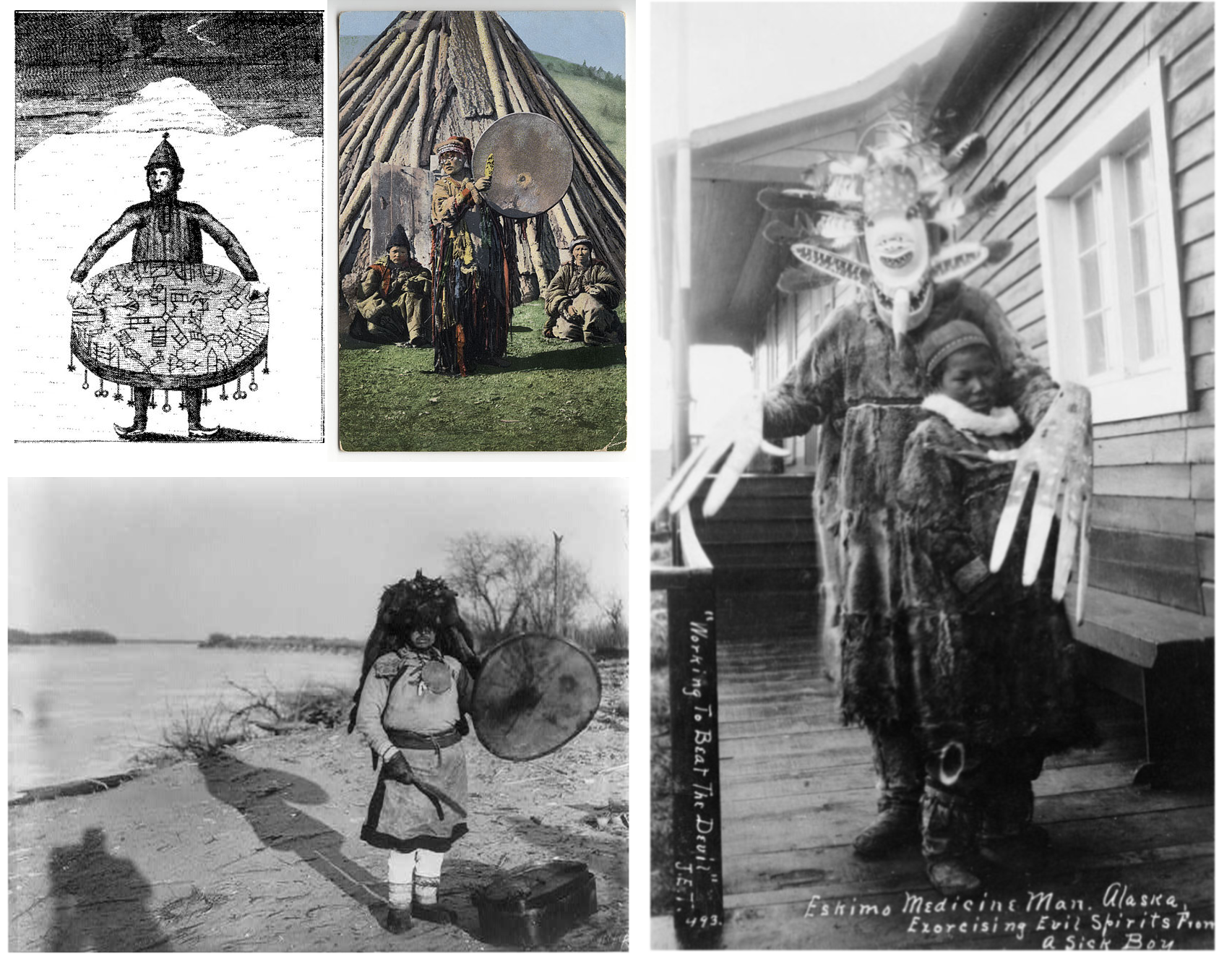
A tableau presenting figures of various cultures filling in mediator-like roles, often being termed as "shaman" in the literature

There is ongoing disagreement (and no general consensus) as to whether animism is merely a singular, broadly encompassing religious belief or a worldview in and of itself, comprising many diverse mythologies found worldwide in many diverse cultures. This also raises a controversy regarding the ethical claims animism may or may not make: whether animism ignores questions of ethics altogether; or, by endowing various non-human elements of nature with spirituality or personhood, it in fact promotes a complex ecological ethics.

In his 1992 book entitled Columbus and Other Cannibals, American historian Jack D. Forbes wrote that the animism of native and folk religious beliefs of Africa, Asia and the Americas was synonymous with "life-ism", and that "perhaps that is what we need, 'lifeism', more respect for life, more respect for the living, more respect for all forms of life." In the 2012 book The Routledge Companion to Religion and Science it is noted that "the European tradition of referring to Native world-views as forms of animism is quite correct, if understood non-reductively, since the term "animism" can literally be understood as "life-ism."

=== Concepts ===
==== Distinction from pantheism ====
Animism is not the same as pantheism, although the two are sometimes confused. Moreover, some religions are both pantheistic and animistic. One of the main differences is that while animists believe everything to be spiritual in nature, they do not necessarily see the spiritual nature of everything in existence as being united (monism) the way pantheists do. As a result, animism puts more emphasis on the uniqueness of each individual soul. In pantheism, everything shares the same spiritual essence, rather than having distinct spirits or souls. For example, Giordano Bruno equated the world soul with God and espoused a pantheistic animism.

==== Fetishism / totemism ====
In many animistic world views, the human being is often regarded as on a roughly equal footing with other animals, plants, and natural forces.

=== African indigenous religions ===
Traditional African religions: most religious traditions of Sub-Saharan Africa are basically a complex form of animism with polytheistic and shamanistic elements and ancestor worship.

In West Africa, the Serer religious (A ƭat Roog) encompasses ancestor veneration (not worship) via the Pangool. The Pangool are the Serer ancestral spirits and interceders between the living and the Divine, Roog.

In East Africa, the Kerma culture displays animistic elements similar to other Traditional African religions. In contrast to the later polytheistic Napatan and Meroitic periods, the Kerma culture, with displays of animals in Amulets and the esteemed antiques of Lions, appears to be an Animistic culture rather than a polytheistic culture. The Kermans likely treated Jebel Barkal as a special sacred site, and passed it on to the Kushites and Egyptians who venerated the mesa.

In North Africa, the traditional Berber religion includes the traditional polytheistic, animist, and in some rare cases, shamanistic, religions of the Berber people.

=== Asian origin religions ===
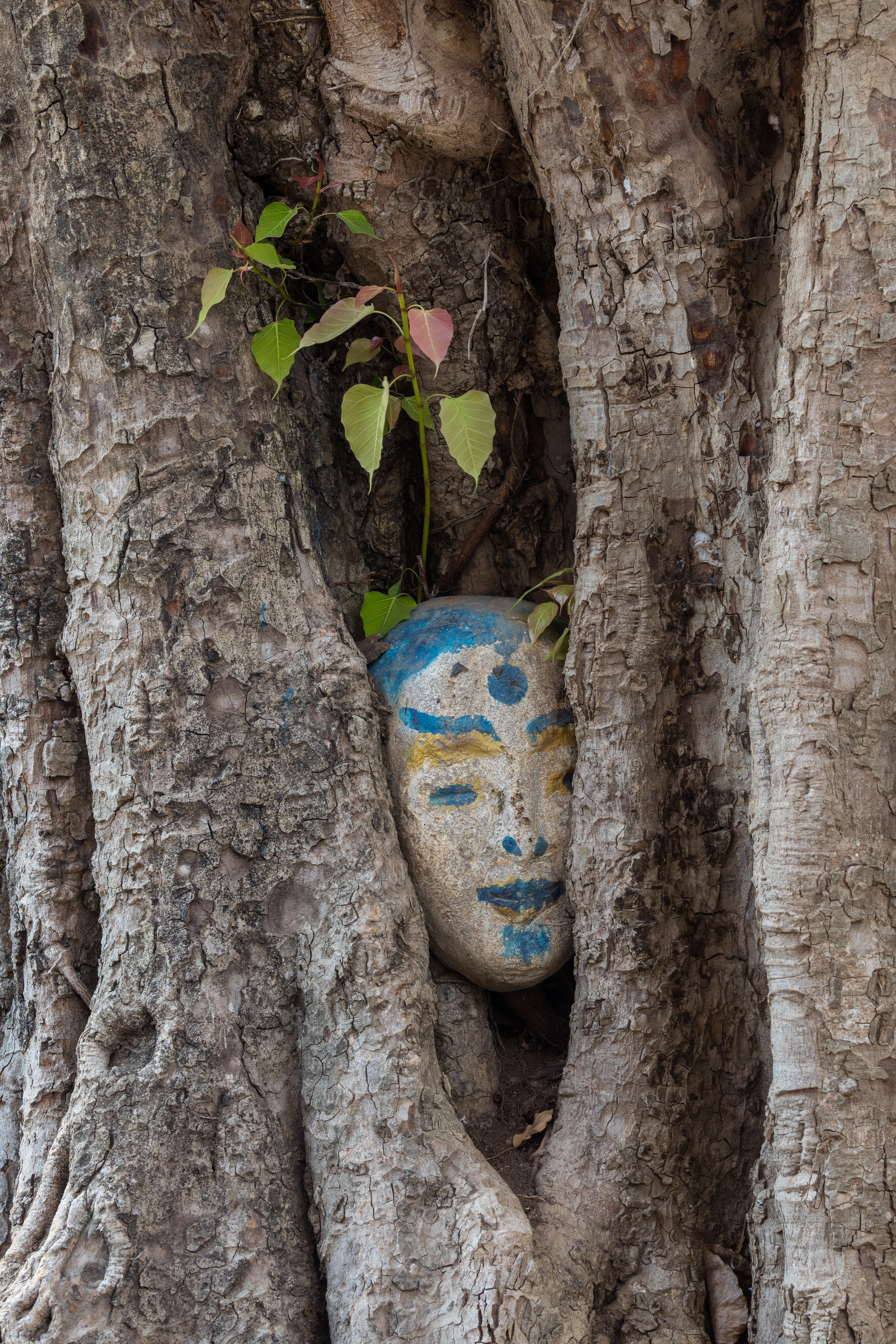
Ingrown sculpture of human head in a tree trunk in Laos

==== Indian-origin religions ====
In the Indian-origin religions, namely Hinduism, Buddhism, Jainism, and Sikhism, the animistic aspects of nature worship and ecological conservation are part of the core belief system.

Matsya Purana, a Hindu text, has a Sanskrit shloka (hymn), which explains the importance of reverence of ecology. It states: "A pond equals ten wells, a reservoir equals ten ponds, while a son equals ten reservoirs, and a tree equals ten sons." Indian religions worship trees such as the Bodhi Tree and numerous superlative banyan trees, conserve the sacred groves of India, revere the rivers as sacred, and worship the mountains and their ecology.

Panchavati are the sacred trees in Indic religions, which are sacred groves containing five type of trees, usually chosen from among the Vata (Ficus benghalensis, Banyan), Ashvattha (Ficus religiosa, Peepal), Bilva (Aegle marmelos, Bengal Quince), Amalaki (Phyllanthus emblica, Indian Gooseberry, Amla), Ashoka (Saraca asoca, Ashok), Udumbara (Ficus racemosa, Cluster Fig, Gular), Nimba (Azadirachta indica, Neem) and Shami (Prosopis spicigera, Indian Mesquite).

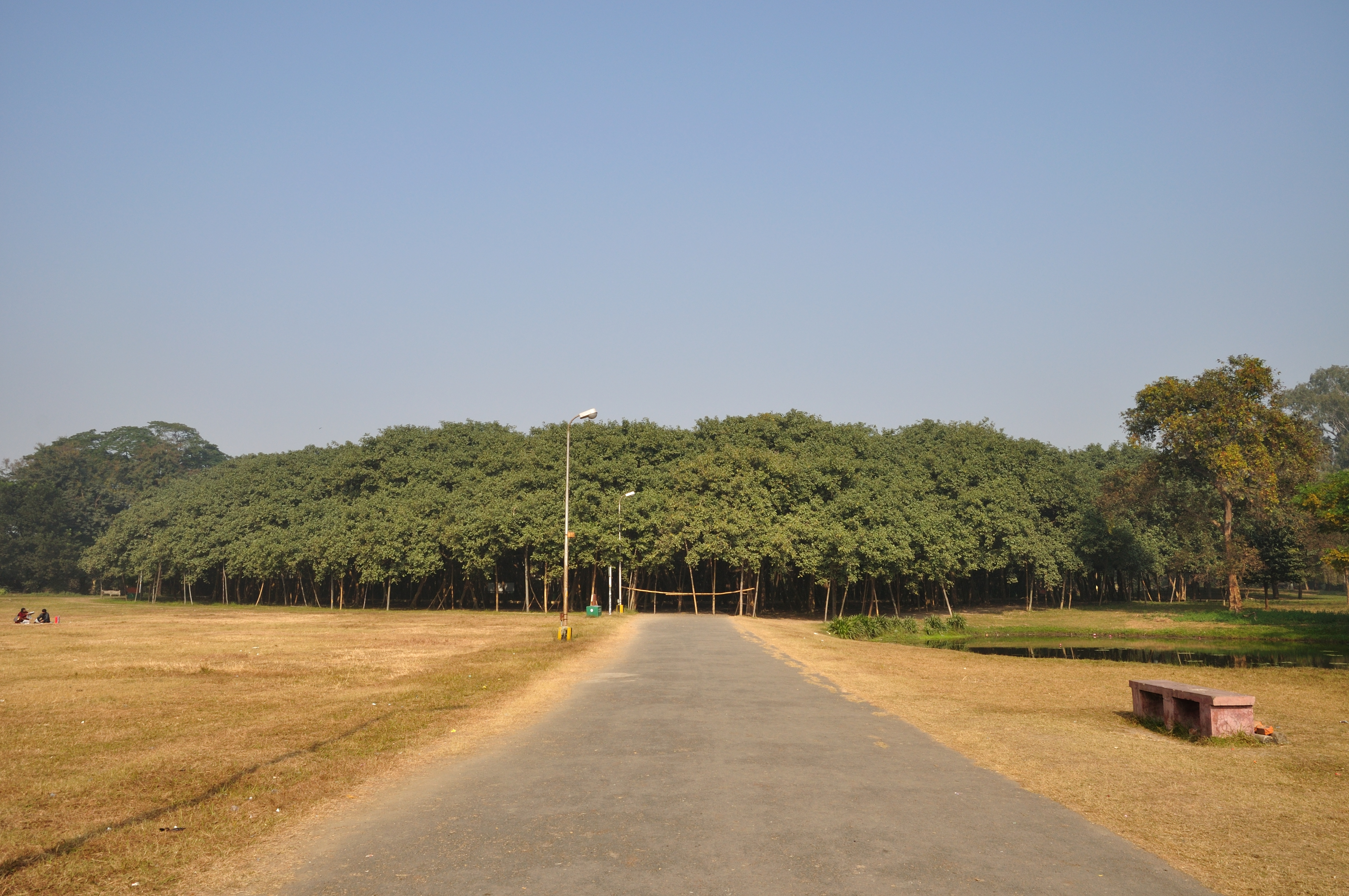
Thimmamma Marrimanu – the Great Banyan tree revered by the people of Indian-origin religions such as Hinduism (including Vedic, Shaivism, Dravidian Hinduism), Buddhism, Jainism, and Sikhism

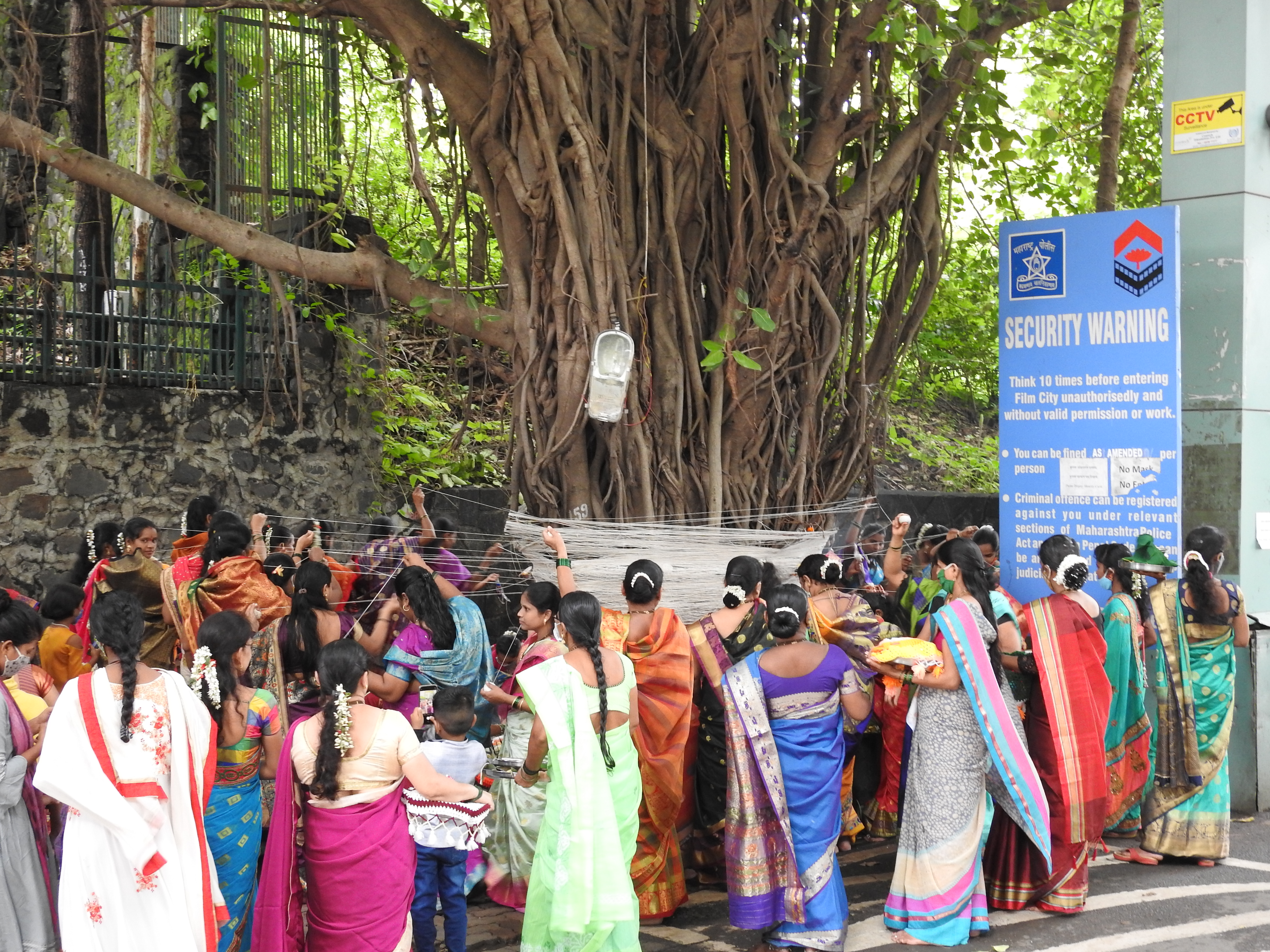
During Vat Purnima festival, married women tie threads around a banyan tree in India.

The banyan is considered holy in several religious traditions of India. The Ficus benghalensis is the national tree of India. Vat Purnima is a Hindu festival related to the banyan tree, and is observed by married women in North India and in the Western Indian states of Maharashtra, Goa, Gujarat. For three days of the month of Jyeshtha in the Hindu calendar (which falls in May–June in the Gregorian calendar) married women observe a fast, tie threads around a banyan tree, and pray for the well-being of their husbands. Thimmamma Marrimanu, sacred to Indian religions, has branches spread over five acres and was listed as the world's largest banyan tree in the Guinness World Records in 1989.

In Hinduism, the leaf of the banyan tree is said to be the resting place for the god Krishna. In the Bhagavat Gita, Krishna said, "There is a banyan tree which has its roots upward and its branches down, and the Vedic hymns are its leaves. One who knows this tree is the knower of the Vedas." (Bg 15.1)

In Buddhism's Pali canon, the banyan (Pali: nigrodha) is referenced numerous times. Typical metaphors allude to the banyan's epiphytic nature, likening the banyan's supplanting of a host tree as comparable to the way sensual desire (kāma) overcomes humans.

Mun (also known as Munism or Bongthingism) is the traditional polytheistic, animist, shamanistic, and syncretic religion of the Lepcha people.

Sanamahism is an ethnic religion of the Meitei people of Kangleipak (Meitei for 'Manipur') in Northeast India. It is a polytheistic and animist religion and is named after Lainingthou Sanamahi, one of the most important deities of the Meitei faith.

==== Chinese religions ====
Shendao (Chinese: 神道; pinyin: shéndào; lit. 'the Way of the Gods') is a term originated by Chinese folk religions influenced by Mohist, Confucian, and Taoist philosophy, referring to the divine order of nature or the Wuxing.

The Shang dynasty's state religion was practiced from 1600 BCE to 1046 BCE and was built on the idea of spiritualizing natural phenomena.

==== Japan and Shinto ====
Shinto is the traditional Japanese folk religion and has many animist aspects. The kami (神), a class of supernatural beings, are central to Shinto. All things, including natural forces and well-known geographical locations, are thought to be home to the kami. The kami are worshipped at kamidana household shrines, family shrines, and jinja public shrines.

The Ryukyuan religion of the Ryukyu Islands is distinct from Shinto, but shares similar characteristics.

==== Kalash people ====
Kalash people of Northern Pakistan follow an ancient animistic religion identified with an ancient form of Hinduism.

They are considered unique among the people of Pakistan. They are also considered to be Pakistan's smallest ethnoreligious group, and traditionally practice what authors characterise as a form of animism. (Note: Nowhere is this more evident than among the pagan Kalash, a non-Islamic community living in the isolated valleys of Chitral whose faith is founded on animism.) (Note: The Kalash people are small in number, hardly exceeding 3,000, but ... as well as having their own language and costume, they practice animism (the worship of spirits in nature) ...) During the mid-20th century an attempt was made to force a few Kalasha villages in Pakistan to convert to Islam, but the people fought the conversion and, once official pressure was removed, the vast majority resumed the practice of their own religion. Nevertheless, some Kalasha have since converted to Islam, despite being shunned afterward by their community for having done so.

The term is used to refer to many distinct people including the Väi, the Čima-nišei, the Vântä, plus the Ashkun- and Tregami-speakers. The Kalash are considered to be an indigenous people of Asia, with their ancestors migrating to Chitral Valley from another location possibly further south, which the Kalash call "Tsiyam" in their folk songs and epics.

They claim to descend from the armies of Alexander who were left behind from his armed campaign, though no evidence exists for him to have passed the area.

The neighbouring Nuristani people of the adjacent Nuristan (historically known as Kafiristan) once had the same culture and practised a faith very similar to that of the Kalash, differing in a few minor particulars.

The first historically recorded Islamic invasions of their lands were by the Ghaznavids in the 11th century while they themselves are first attested in 1339 during Timur's invasions. Nuristan had been forcibly converted to Islam in 1895–96, although some evidence has shown the people continued to practice their customs. The Kalash of Chitral have maintained their own separate cultural traditions.

==== Korea ====
Musok, the native Korean belief, has many animist aspects. While gods in Musok generally incarnate as humans, they will at times appear in the natural landscape, which some have compared to animism.

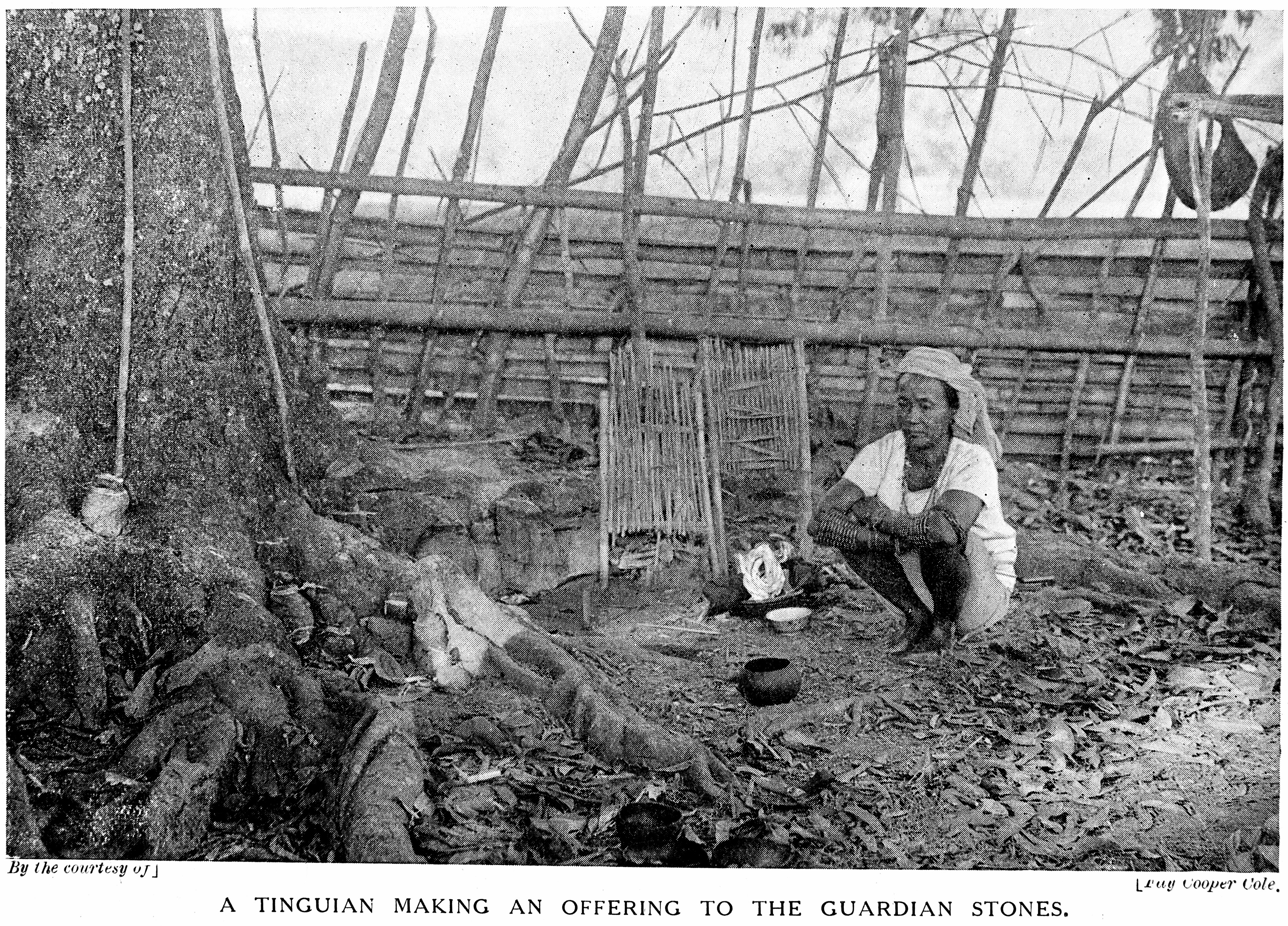
A 1922 photograph of an Itneg priestess making an offering to an apdel, a guardian anito spirit of her village that reside in the water-worn stones known as pinaing

==== Philippines indigenous religions ====
In the indigenous Philippine folk religions, pre-colonial religions of Philippines and Philippine mythology, animism is part of their core beliefs as demonstrated by the belief in Anito, Diwata and Bathala as well as their conservation and veneration of sacred Indigenous Philippine shrines, forests, mountains and sacred grounds.

Anito are the wooden statues and ancestor spirits in the various indigenous shamanistic folk religions, led by female or feminized male shamans known as babaylan. It includes belief in a spirit world existing alongside and interacting with the material world, as well as the belief that everything has a spirit, from rocks and trees to animals and humans to natural phenomena.

In indigenous Filipino belief, the Bathala is the omnipotent deity, which was derived from Sanskrit word for the Hindu supreme deity Bhattara, as one of the ten avatars of the Hindu god Vishnu. The omnipotent Bathala also presides over the spirits of ancestors called Anito. Anitos serve as intermediaries between mortals and the divine, such as Agni (Hindu) who holds the access to divine realms; for this reason they are invoked first and are the first to receive offerings, regardless of the deity the worshipper wants to pray to.

==== Abrahamic religions ====
Animism also has influences in Abrahamic religions.

The Old Testament and the Wisdom literature preach the omnipresence of God (Jeremiah 23:24; Proverbs 15:3; 1 Kings 8:27), and God is bodily present in the incarnation of his Son, Jesus Christ. (Gospel of John 1:14, Colossians 2:9). Animism is not peripheral to Christian identity but is its nurturing home ground, its axis mundi. In addition to the conceptual work the term animism performs, it provides insight into the relational character and common personhood of material existence.

The Christian spiritual mapping movement is based upon a similar worldview to that of animism. It involves researching and mapping the spiritual and social history of an area in order to determine the demon (territorial spirit) controlling an area and preventing evangelism, so that the demon can be defeated through spiritual warfare prayer and rituals. Both posit that an invisible spirit world is active and that it can be interacted with or controlled, with the Christian belief that such power to control the spirit world comes from God rather than being inherent to objects or places. "The animist believes that rituals and objects contain spiritual power, whereas a Christian believes that rituals and objects may convey power. Animists seek to manipulate power, whereas Christians seek to submit to God and to learn to work with his power."

With rising awareness of ecological preservation, recently theologians like Mark I. Wallace argue for animistic Christianity with a biocentric approach that understands God being present in all earthly objects, such as animals, trees, and rocks.

==== Pre-Islamic Arab religion ====
Pre-Islamic Arab religion can refer to the traditional polytheistic, animist, and in some rare cases, shamanistic, religions of the peoples of the Arabian Peninsula. The belief in jinn, invisible entities akin to spirits in the Western sense dominant in the Arab religious systems, hardly fit the description of Animism in a strict sense. The jinn are considered to be analogous to the human soul by living lives like that of humans, but they are not exactly like human souls neither are they spirits of the dead. It is unclear if belief in jinn derived from nomadic or sedentary populations.

=== Paganism ===
Animism has been identified as a foundational element in the development of many ancient and modern pagan religious traditions. As one of the earliest spiritual worldviews, animism is characterized by the belief that elements of the natural world—including animals, plants, geographical features, and weather systems—possess spirit or agency. Scholars have noted that this perspective influenced the cosmologies of numerous pre-modern societies and contributed to the development of polytheistic and nature-based religious systems that are now categorized as Pagan traditions.

==== Ancient paganism with animist roots ====
In various ancient cultures, such as those of the Celts, Norse, Greeks, Romans, and Slavs, religious beliefs often incorporated elements now associated with animism. Natural features were frequently regarded as sacred or inhabited by spiritual beings. Deities were often linked to specific rivers, trees, mountains, or celestial bodies. According to historian Ronald Hutton, nature in these contexts was not only revered but considered to be "alive and participatory" in religious life.

While these societies developed organized pantheons and mythological systems, many retained a view of the natural world that reflected animistic thought. Practices such as offering rituals at springs, maintaining sacred groves, or acknowledging local land spirits illustrate the integration of animistic concepts within broader polytheistic frameworks.

==== Continuity in folk religion ====
Following the spread of monotheistic religions, especially Christianity, across much of Europe, many animistic and Pagan practices were suppressed or reinterpreted. Nevertheless, aspects of animistic belief persisted through folk religion, particularly in rural communities. Customs such as venerating household spirits, seasonal festivals tied to agricultural cycles, and the personification of natural phenomena continued in modified forms. For example, certain wells and springs that were originally associated with local deities came to be associated with Christian saints, suggesting a degree of continuity between animistic and Christian devotional practices.

These continuities were often preserved through oral traditions, local rituals, and folk customs, contributing to the survival of animistic perspectives beyond their original religious contexts.

==== Revival and modern pagan movements ====
The 19th and 20th centuries saw renewed interest in pre-Christian religions and folklore, influenced by Romanticism, antiquarian studies, and the emergence of national identities. This cultural movement laid the groundwork for contemporary Pagan traditions, such as Wicca, Druidry, and Heathenry, which often draw upon animistic concepts.

Some scholars and practitioners of modern Paganism incorporate animism into their religious frameworks. Graham Harvey has noted that contemporary Pagan worldviews frequently emphasize relationality and agency within the natural world, viewing humans as part of a larger network of sentient beings. In Wiccan and other Pagan rituals, for example, elements such as earth, air, fire, and water are invoked not only symbolically but as active, spiritually significant forces. This approach reflects an animistic orientation toward the environment.

==== Contemporary interpretations ====
In recent decades, animism has been reimagined in both academic and spiritual circles. Rather than viewing it simply as a set of beliefs, many modern interpretations understand animism as a relational ontology—a way of being that centers on relationships and mutual respect between humans and non-human entities. This approach presents animism as a legitimate and coherent worldview, one that offers an alternative to Cartesian dualism and materialist perspectives by emphasizing connection over separation.

Emma Restall Orr, a British author and Druidic practitioner, has argued that animism provides a philosophical basis for environmental ethics and personal spirituality within contemporary Paganism. Similarly, Sabina Magliocco has documented the presence of animistic themes in American Neo-Pagan practices, including rituals, festivals, and magical systems.

Contemporary expressions of animism often align with ecological values, highlighting themes like sustainability, interdependence, and a deep respect for the natural world. Within this context, animism is no longer seen as outdated or primitive, but as a meaningful way for people to engage with both their environment and the spiritual forces they perceive within it. The New Age movement, for instance, often incorporates animistic elements, such as beliefs in nature spirits and energetic connections with the Earth.

In recent years, animism has also found a place within emerging spiritual paths. Many neopagan groups—including Eco-pagans—identify as animists, expressing reverence for the web of life and the unseen presences they believe share the world and cosmos with humanity.

=== Shamanism ===
A shaman is a person regarded as having access to, and influence in, the world of benevolent and malevolent spirits, who typically enters into a trance state during a ritual, and practices divination and healing.

According to Mircea Eliade, shamanism encompasses the premise that shamans are intermediaries or messengers between the human world and the spirit worlds. Shamans are said to treat ailments and illnesses by mending the soul. Alleviating traumas affecting the soul or spirit restores the physical body of the individual to balance and wholeness. The shaman also enters supernatural realms or dimensions to obtain solutions to problems afflicting the community. Shamans may visit other worlds or dimensions to bring guidance to misguided souls and to ameliorate illnesses of the human soul caused by foreign elements. The shaman operates primarily within the spiritual world, which in turn affects the human world. The restoration of balance results in the elimination of the ailment.

Abram, however, articulates a less supernatural and much more ecological understanding of the shaman's role than that propounded by Eliade. Drawing upon his own field research in Indonesia, Nepal, and the Americas, Abram suggests that in animistic cultures, the shaman functions primarily as an intermediary between the human community and the more-than-human community of active agencies—the local animals, plants, and landforms (mountains, rivers, forests, winds, and weather patterns, all of which are felt to have their own specific sentience). Hence, the shaman's ability to heal individual instances of disease (or imbalance) within the human community is a byproduct of their more continual practice of balancing the reciprocity between the human community and the wider collective of animate beings in which that community is embedded.

== Animist life ==
=== Non-human animals ===
Animism entails the belief that all living things have a soul, and thus, a central concern of animist thought surrounds how animals can be eaten, or otherwise used for humans' subsistence needs. The actions of non-human animals are viewed as "intentional, planned and purposive", and they are understood to be persons, as they are both alive, and communicate with others.

In animist worldviews, non-human animals are understood to participate in kinship systems and ceremonies with humans, as well as having their own kinship systems and ceremonies. Graham Harvey cited an example of an animist understanding of animal behavior that occurred at a powwow held by the Conne River Mi'kmaq in 1996; an eagle flew over the proceedings, circling over the central drum group. The assembled participants called out kitpu ('eagle'), conveying welcome to the bird and expressing pleasure at its beauty, and they later articulated the view that the eagle's actions reflected its approval of the event, and the Mi'kmaq's return to traditional spiritual practices.

In animism, rituals are performed to maintain relationships between humans and spirits. Indigenous peoples often perform these rituals to appease the spirits and request their assistance during activities such as hunting and healing. In the Arctic region, certain rituals are common before the hunt as a means to show respect for the spirits of animals.

=== Flora ===
Some animists also view plant and fungi life as persons and interact with them accordingly. The most common encounter between humans and these plant and fungi persons is with the former's collection of the latter for food, and for animists, this interaction typically has to be carried out respectfully. Harvey cited the example of Māori communities in New Zealand, who often offer karakia invocations to sweet potatoes as they dig up the latter. While doing so, there is an awareness of a kinship relationship between the Māori and the sweet potatoes, with both understood as having arrived in Aotearoa together in the same canoes.

In other instances, animists believe that interaction with plant and fungi persons can result in the communication of things unknown or even otherwise unknowable. Among some modern Pagans, for instance, relationships are cultivated with specific trees, who are understood to bestow knowledge or physical gifts, such as flowers, sap, or wood that can be used as firewood or to fashion into a wand; in return, these Pagans give offerings to the tree itself, which can come in the form of libations of mead or ale, a drop of blood from a finger, or a strand of wool.

=== The elements ===
Various animistic cultures also comprehend stones as persons. Discussing ethnographic work conducted among the Ojibwe, Harvey noted that their society generally conceived of stones as being inanimate, but with two notable exceptions: the stones of the Bell Rocks and those stones which are situated beneath trees struck by lightning, which were understood to have become Thunderers themselves. The Ojibwe conceived of weather as being capable of having personhood, with storms being conceived of as persons known as 'Thunderers' whose sounds conveyed communications and who engaged in seasonal conflict over the lakes and forests, throwing lightning at lake monsters. Wind, similarly, can be conceived as a person in animistic thought.

The importance of place is also a recurring element of animism, with some places being understood to be persons in their own right.

=== Spirits ===
Animism can also entail relationships being established with non-corporeal spirit entities.

== Other usage ==
=== Psychology ===
From his studies into child development, Jean Piaget suggested that children were born with an innate animist worldview in which they anthropomorphized inanimate objects and that it was only later that they grew out of this belief. Conversely, from her ethnographic research, Margaret Mead argued the opposite, believing that children were not born with an animist worldview but that they became acculturated to such beliefs as they were educated by their society.

Stewart Guthrie saw animism—or "attribution" as he preferred it—as an evolutionary strategy to aid survival. He argued that both humans and other animal species view inanimate objects as potentially alive as a means of being constantly on guard against potential threats. His suggested explanation, however, did not deal with the question of why such a belief became central to the religion. In 2000, Guthrie suggested that the "most widespread" concept of animism was that it was the "attribution of spirits to natural phenomena such as stones and trees."

=== Attempts to reconcile with science ===
In the early 20th century, William McDougall defended a form of animism in his book Body and Mind: A History and Defence of Animism (1911).

Physicist Nick Herbert has argued for "quantum animism" in which the mind permeates the world at every level:

The quantum consciousness assumption, which amounts to a kind of "quantum animism" likewise asserts that consciousness is an integral part of the physical world, not an emergent property of special biological or computational systems. Since everything in the world is on some level a quantum system, this assumption requires that everything be conscious on that level. If the world is truly quantum animated, then there is an immense amount of invisible inner experience going on all around us that is presently inaccessible to humans, because our own inner lives are imprisoned inside a small quantum system, isolated deep in the meat of an animal brain.

Werner Krieglstein wrote regarding his quantum animism:

Herbert's quantum Animism differs from traditional Animism in that it avoids assuming a dualistic model of mind and matter. Traditional dualism assumes that some kind of spirit inhabits a body and makes it move, a ghost in the machine. Herbert's quantum Animism presents the idea that every natural system has an inner life, a conscious center, from which it directs and observes its action.

In Error and Loss: A Licence to Enchantment (2018) by Ashley Curtis it is argued that the Cartesian idea of an experiencing subject facing off with an inert physical world is incoherent at its very foundation and that this incoherence is consistent with rather than belied by Darwinism. Human reason (and its rigorous extension in the natural sciences) fits an evolutionary niche just as echolocation does for bats and infrared vision does for pit vipers, and is epistemologically on a par with, rather than superior to, such capabilities. The meaning or aliveness of the "objects" we encounter, rocks, trees, rivers, and other animals, thus depends for its validity not on a detached cognitive judgment, but purely on the quality of our experience. The animist experience, or the wolf's or raven's experience, thus becomes licensed as equally valid worldviews to the modern western scientific one; they are indeed more valid, since they are not plagued with the incoherence that inevitably arises when "objective existence" is separated from "subjective experience."

=== Socio-political impact ===
Harvey opined that animism's views on personhood represented a radical challenge to the dominant perspectives of modernity, because it accords "intelligence, rationality, consciousness, volition, agency, intentionality, language, and desire" to non-humans. Similarly, it challenges the view of human uniqueness that is prevalent in both Abrahamic religions and Western rationalism.

=== Art and literature ===
Animist beliefs can also be expressed through artwork. For instance, among the Māori communities of New Zealand, there is an acknowledgement that creating art through carving wood or stone entails violence against the wood or stone person and that the persons who are damaged therefore have to be placated and respected during the process; any excess or waste from the creation of the artwork is returned to the land, while the artwork itself is treated with particular respect. Harvey, therefore, argued that the creation of art among the Māori was not about creating an inanimate object for display, but rather a transformation of different persons within a relationship.

Harvey expressed the view that animist worldviews were present in various works of literature, citing such examples as the writings of Alan Garner, Leslie Silko, Barbara Kingsolver, Alice Walker, Daniel Quinn, Linda Hogan, David Abram, Patricia Grace, Chinua Achebe, Ursula Le Guin, Louise Erdrich, and Marge Piercy.

Animist worldviews have also been identified in the animated films of Hayao Miyazaki.

== See also ==
- Anecdotal cognitivism
- Anima mundi
- Dayawism
- Ecotheology
- Hylozoism
- Mana
- Mauri (life force)
- Kaitiaki
- Panpsychism
- Religion and environmentalism
- Sacred trees
- Shamanism
- Wildlife totemization
