= Cognitivism =

Cognitivism may refer to:

- Cognitivism (ethics), the philosophical view that ethical sentences express propositions and are capable of being true or false
- Cognitivism (psychology), a psychological approach that argues that mental function can be understood as the internal manipulation of symbols
- Cognitivism (aesthetics), a view that cognitive psychology can help understand art and the response to it
- Anecdotal cognitivism, a psychological methodology for interpreting animal behavior in terms of mental states

== See also ==
- Cognition, the study of the human mind
- Cognitive anthropology
- Cognitive science
- Computationalism
- Philosophy of mind
- Situated cognition
- Socio-cognitive
- Symbol grounding
