= Nurit Bird-David =

Israeli academic

- נורית בירד-דוד
- Born: 29 September 1951 (age 75)

Academic background
- Education: University of Cambridge

Academic work
- Discipline: Cultural anthropology
- Main interests: hunter-gatherers, Animism, cultures of home making and intimacy, micro-scale societies, relational epistomology
- Website: https://sites.google.com/soc.haifa.ac.il/bird-david/

Nurit Bird-David (Hebrew: נורית בירד-דוד; born 29 September 1951) is a professor of cultural anthropology at the University of Haifa, Israel. She is best known for her study of the Nayaka hunter-gatherers in South India, upon which she based much of her writings on animism, relational epistemology, and indigenous small-scale communities, and which later inspired additional fieldwork and insights on home-making in contemporary industrial societies, and the theoretical concept of scale in anthropology and other social sciences.

== Biography ==
Bird-David studied economics and mathematics at the Hebrew University of Jerusalem (BA cum laude 1975) and social anthropology at Cambridge University, Trinity College (PhD 1983). Her doctoral work was conducted with the Nayaka people in South India, studying their social system. Bird-David has been a research fellow at New Hall, Cambridge (1985–1987). She was appointed as a lecturer in sociology and anthropology at Tel Aviv University (1987–1995) and then moved in 1995 to Haifa University. She became associate professor in 2008, and full professor in 2017. She was a visiting scholar at the University of Cambridge (Smuts Institute for Commonwealth Studies, 1991), at Harvard University (2008) and at University College London (2017).

Bird-David is a member of the Advisory Board of the World Council of Anthropological Associations.

Much of her work is based on her early ethnographic fieldwork on the Nayaka. Bird-David began working with them in 1978, a decade before governmental and nongovernmental agents reached them, and has since continued to study their changing lifeways for four decades.

Bird-David is most well-known for her work on animism and more-than-human relations of contemporary hunter-gatherer peoples. Studying the Nayaka, she noted their approach to the natural environment as a community of related humans and nonhumans. Bird-David argued that this animistic approach embodies a mode of knowing and being in the world that can be called a “relational epistemology”. In turn, she claimed that this mode fosters an intimate understanding of the environment and shapes manifold aspects of hunter-gatherer cultures, such as affluent economies, sharing, communication with ancestors, illness-healing practices, and parent-child relations. Her works have since been highly cited and referenced in studies discussing animism, hunter-gatherer cultural life, and more-than-human perceptions of the environment. She is often credited as being among the initiators of the anthropological re-visitation of animism, leading to a new academic discourse on human and non-human relations, and standing at the root of the ontological turn in anthropology.

In 2018 Bird-David received the award of life achievement by the International Society for Hunter Gatherer Research (ISHGR).

Bird-David's experience with hunter-gatherers led her to consider other cases of indigenous small-scale societies, particularly the significance of the concept of scale in anthropological theory. Ethnographically describing the distinctive phenomenological and cultural experiences of life in minuscule hunter-gatherer societies, she argues that Anthropology has long neglected group size, horizons of concerns, and scalability in describing and explaining such small-scale worlds and comparing them to larger-scale societies (especially global society and nation-states).

Bird-David's interest in small-scale communities, scale, and perceptions of the environment, has led her to later study cultures of home in the neoliberal and digital age. Extending the notions of intimate communal structures and scalability developed in her previous research, she studied home-construction and home-design practices in Israeli society, and is currently conducting a cross-cultural study of Airbnb home-sharing with strangers. In these projects Bird-David examines the relation between digitally-enabled huge scales of connectivity, and small-scale cultures of home and daily living.
