= Pennathur Subramania Iyer =

Commissioner for Mylapore division (Madras Corporation)
- In office 1890–1901

Personal details
- Born: 1860 Pennathur
- Died: 1901 (aged 40–41) Mylapore, Madras
- Children: P.S.Ganapathy

Pennathur Subramania Iyer (1860–1901) was an Indian lawyer and philanthropist who is best known as the founder of the P. S. Charities.

== Early life ==
Pennathur Subramania Iyer was born in Pennathur in Chittoor in the then North Arcot district of Madras Presidency. His father, P. Veeraraghava Iyer, had served as the Deputy Collector of Tinnevely.

While studying at the Presidency College, Madras, Subramanya Iyer's father died and he had to discontinue his studies. Subramanya Iyer sought employment in service of the government and soon rose to become Sub-Registrar of Tadpatri in Bellary district by 1878.

== Career in law ==
Following the advice of Sir S. Subramania Iyer, Subramanya Iyer studied law and enrolled as a solicitor.

== Politics ==
Subramanya Iyer served as the Commissioner for Mylapore division in the Madras Corporation from 1890 to 1901.

Subramanya was attacked by rheumatism in 1898. He succumbed to the disease on March 1, 1901.

== See also ==
- P.S. Higher Secondary School
- P.S. Senior Secondary School
