= Pennathur =

- city
- Location in Tamil Nadu, India Pennathur (India)
- Coordinates: 12°24′N 79°22′E
- Country: India
- State: Tamil Nadu
- District: Vellore District

Population (2001)
  - Total: 8,014

Languages
  - Official: Tamil
- Time zone: UTC+5:30 (IST)

Pennathur is a panchayat town in Vellore district in the Indian state of Tamil Nadu.

== Demographics ==
As of 2001 India census, Pennathur had a population of 8014. Males constitute 49% of the population and females 51%. Pennathur has an average literacy rate of 68%, higher than the national average of 59.5%: male literacy is 76%, and female literacy is 60%. In Pennathur, 10% of the population is under 6 years of age.
