= Thimmamma Marrimanu =

Banyan tree with the world's broadest known crown

Coordinates: 14°1′40.80″N 78°19′30.37″E

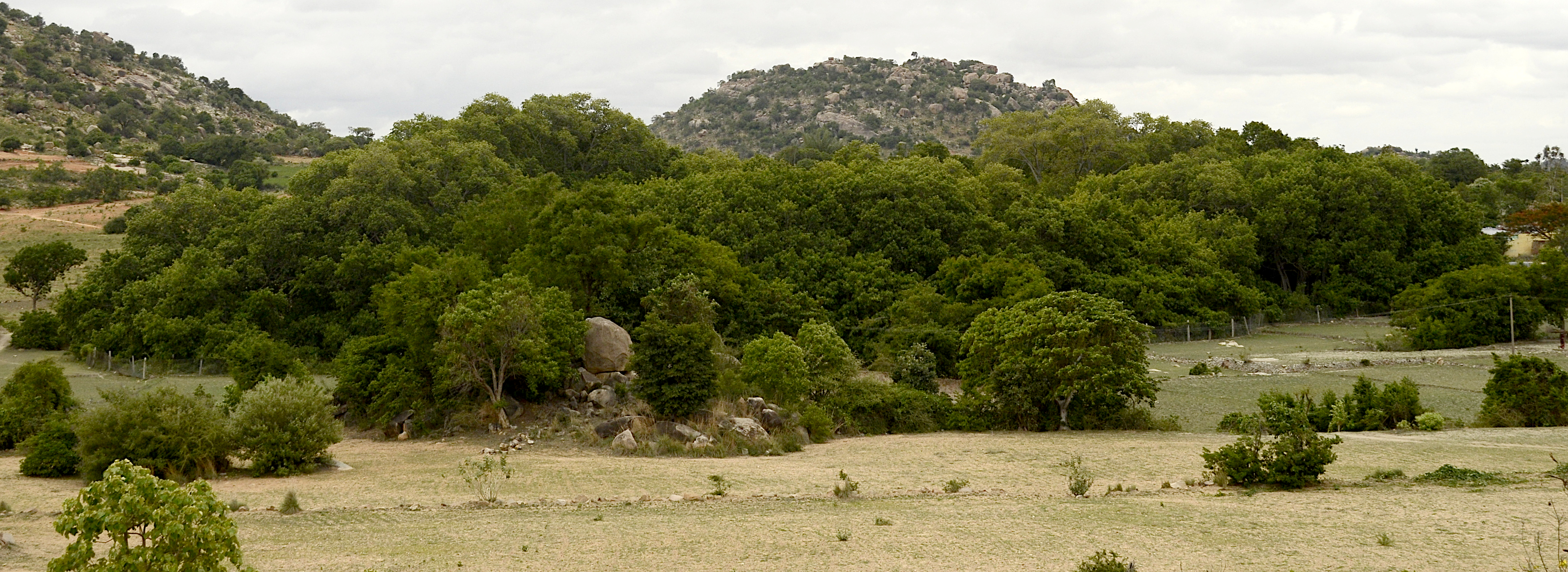
- Species: Banyan (Ficus benghalensis)
- Location: Anantapur, Andhra Pradesh, India
- Date seeded: 1434

Thimmamma Marrimanu (Telugu: తిమ్మమ్మ మర్రిమాను, lit. 'Thimmamma's Banyan Tree') is a banyan tree in Anantapur, located about 25 kilometers from Kadiri, Andhra Pradesh, India. It is probably a specimen of Ficus benghalensis. In the Telugu language, "marri" denotes "banyan" and "manu" denotes "trunk". Its canopy covers 19,107 m^{2} (4.721 acres), and it was recorded as the largest tree specimen in the world in the Guinness Book of World Records in 1989. The tree is revered by Hindus, Buddhists and Jains.

== Legend ==
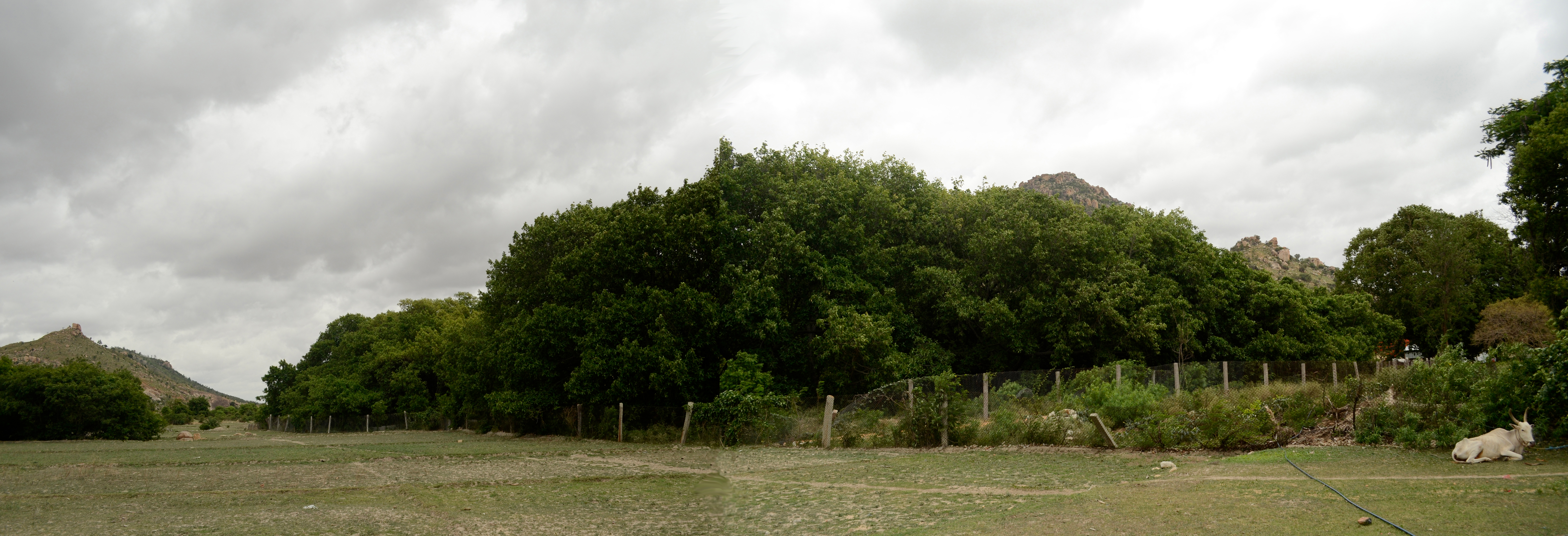
Photo collage of Thimmamma Marrimanu tree

According to a local myth, the tree is named after Thimmamma, a woman who committed sati (suicide by throwing herself on the funeral pyre of her husband's dead body). The tree is said to have originated from one of the poles used in the funeral pyre.

== Religious significance ==
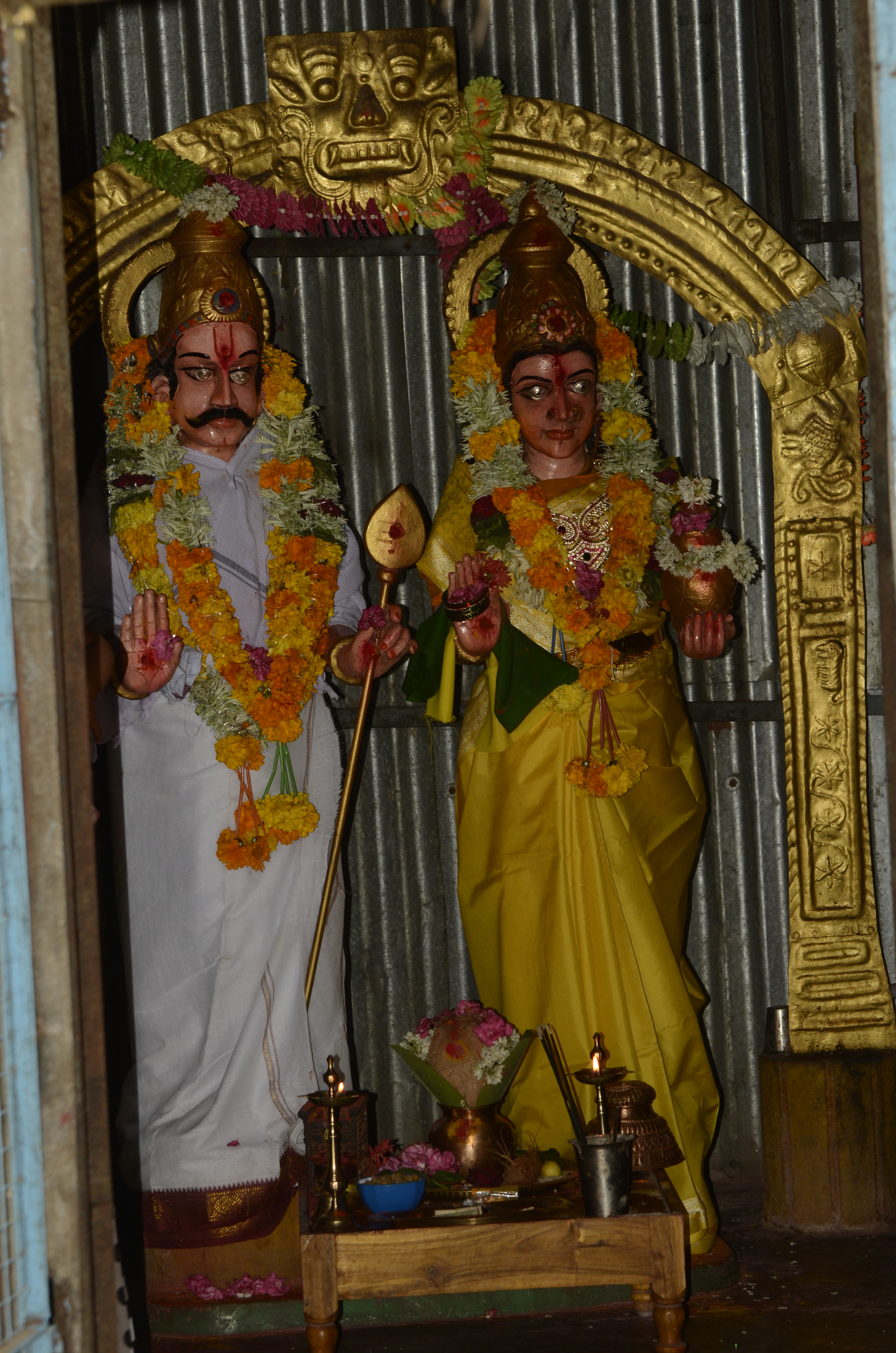
Deity inside the Thimmamma Marrimanu Temple

The great banyan tree is revered by the people of Indian-origin religions such as Hinduism (including Vedic, Shaivism, Dravidian Hinduism), Buddhism and Jainism. A small temple dedicated to Thimmamma is beneath the tree. The residents of the region strongly believe that if a childless couple worships Thimmamma they will beget a child in the next year. A large jatara is conducted at Thimmamma on the day of the Shivaratri festival, when thousands flock to the tree to worship it.

== Reputation ==
The tree was first noticed and revealed to the world by Regret Iyer (Sathyanarayana Iyer), a freelance journalist and photographer from Bangalore, Karnataka, India, who made all efforts to have the tree recorded in the Guinness Book of World Records as "World's largest Banyan Tree" in the 1989 edition.

A Telugu-language historical novel Sri Veeraiah Nayakuni charitra (Thimmammamarrimanu kata) (Telugu: శ్రీ వీరయ్య నాయకుని చరిత్ర) was written and published by academic Dr. S. S. Giridhara Prasad Roy, in 1989. He translated and published the same story with the title The Story of Thimmammamarrimanu in 2012. He has written an article Thimmammamarrimanu: A Folk Tale of Anantapuramu District in 2016.

Thimmamma Marrimanu was discussed in the second segment of the BBC series The Tree Spirits (29 August 2017).

== See also ==
- List of Banyan trees in India
- List of individual trees
