= Subramanian Iyer =

American engineer of Indian origin

Subramanian S. Iyer is an American engineer of Indian origin. He is a distinguished professor at the Henry Samueli School of Engineering at UCLA and holds the Charles P. Reames Endowed Chair in the Electrical and Computer Engineering, and a joint appointment in the Department of Material Science and engineering. He is also Director of the Center for Heterogeneous Integration and Performance Scaling at UCLA. Prior to joining UCLA in 2015, he was an IBM Fellow and Director of Packaging Development. He is a fellow of the American Physical Society, The International Microelectronics Assembly and Packaging Society and National Academy of Inventors.

== Education ==
Iyer earned a B.Tech. from IIT-Bombay, and Ph.D. from UCLA.
