= Mani Iyer =

Surname

Mani Iyer is a surname. Notable people with the surname include:

- Palghat Mani Iyer (1912–1981), Indian musician
- Madurai Mani Iyer (1912–1968), Indian singer
- Priya Vasudev Mani Iyer (born 1984), Indian actress and model
