= Regret Iyer =

Regret Iyer alias Satyanarayana Iyer (born 28 September 1950) is a writer, photographer, publisher and regret slip collector, residing in Bangalore, India. He was instrumental in finding the largest Banyan Tree in India, the Thimmamma Marrimanu and record the fact in Guinness World Records 1989.

== Regret slip collector ==
Regret Iyer is known to have collected more than 375 regret slips or rejection slips from various magazines and publicised himself as collector of regret slips. He became so famous as regret slip collector that his real name of Satyanarayana is overshadowed by his acquired name, Regret Iyer. His first regret slip was in 1964 for an article on Bijapur. His collection of 375 regret slips is recorded in Limca Book of Records. He also established Regret Iyer Publications and Productions, to encourage younger talents.

== Awards and recognitions ==
Regret Iyer is awarded with T.S.Satyan Memorial Lifetime Achievement award for Best Freelance Photography on 19 December 2011.
