= S. Ganesa Iyer =

Kerala dancer

- Born: 24 December 1912; Varkala, Travancore
- Died: 25 May 2005 (aged 92); Thiruvananthapuram
- Education: University College Thiruvananthapuram
- Occupations: Deputy Director of Public Instruction, Kerala, One of Founders of Margi
- Spouse: T K Seethalakshmi Ammal
- Children: G.S. Iyer, G. Lakshmi Ammal, G. Radha, Dr.G. Krishnan, Dr. G. Parvathi, G. Anand
- Parents: S. Sankaranarayana Iyer (father); Lakshmi (mother)
- Awards: Award for comprehensive contribution to Kathakali by Kerala Kalamandalam

Sankaranarayana Iyer Ganesa Iyer, commonly named as S Ganesa Iyer was 8th descendant of Subbayyan Dalawa. He was born in Varkala.

== Career ==
He started as a teacher and subsequently rose to the position of Deputy Director of Public Instruction, Kerala. While he was the headmaster of Cherthala high school, the then Director of public instruction, Venkiteswara Iyer accepted his idea of conducting a state level school youth festival and entrusted him with the job of conducting the first one of its kind, in Thiruvananthapuram. This was taken forward and today the Kerala State Youth Festival is the biggest school children's art festival of the World.

== Post-retirement ==
He took keen interest in the classical arts of Kerala with a focus on Kathakali, Koodiyattam and Carnatic Classical Music. He was one of the three founder Directors of Margi in Thiruvananthapuram. The trio included Rama P. Iyer and D Appukkuttan Nair. He used to write the Aattaprakaaram; a detailing of the performance of characters in Kathakali, for various Attakatha and used to get it performed in Margi His work on Kathakali won the award from Kerala Kalamandalam. He is the co-author of the first book on Kathakali in French with his disciple Martine Chemana Kendra titled "Kathakali: Théâtre Traditionnel Vivant Du Kerala". Kathakalideepika an anthology was written by him.Sahitya Academy, India has published a book authored by him, which was a collection of abridged form of selected works of notable Malayalam littérateur.
