= Hüseyin Sayram =

Turkish politician (1905 – 1988)

Hüseyin Sayram (1905 – 23 December 1988) was a Turkish politician, provincial chief of the Republican People's Party (CHP). He was the second of the three sons of the Turkish theologian Hacı Zühtü Efendi. He also had a younger and an older sister. Hüseyin Sayram was the starter and patriarch of Sayram family line. Hüseyin was born into a family of a long line of Muslim theologians. He had a fierce positivist intellect and with an ear for music. He was also an accomplished athlete, a sprinter.

== Biography ==
Hüseyin Sayram was born around 1905 in Kayseri, Turkey. A market city of merchants.

He embraced the modernization efforts introduced by Mustafa Kemal Atatürk with enthusiasm and joined the CHP. This led to a schism between him and the traditional ways of his family.

Hüseyin Sayram completed Sivas Öğretmen Okulu (Sivas Teacher's College). He later obtained a musicology degree. He played various musical instruments including violin, kanun and oud. He had a baritone voice. He was appointed as a music teacher at the College for Imams and Preachers. Here, his introduction of violin caused a stir.

When the surname legislation was introduced, making it mandatory for every Turkish citizen to have a family name, Hüseyin chose the surname Sayram from Kutadgu Bilig (The Holy Knowledge) an 11th Century Turkish Encyclopedia by Yusuf Has Hajib, meaning a "musicologist". Sayram also means "blessing" and it is the birthplace of Hoca Ahmed Yesevi in Turkestan.

He performed daily music programs from the PA facility of the local "People's House" (Halkevi). His activities in raising the local culture, arts and music, also his personality gained him considerable respect from the local community.

Hüseyin Sayram was repeatedly elected as the provincial chief of the Republican People's Party (Cumhuriyet Halk Partisi-CHP). He was influential in getting elected three of the 8 MP's allocated to the Kayseri province repeatedly. In 1965 Turhan Feyzioğlu, one of his protégés left CHP and formed his own party The Trust Party (Güven Partisi).

After the military coup of 1980, the CHP was abolished by the military junta and Hüseyon Sayram was forced to retire from political life. When the bans on political parties were eased, he became the provincial head of the newly formed Populist Party (Halkçı Parti). He remained politically active until the age of 83. He was the oldest provincial party leader when he retired.

Hüseyin Sayram died on 23 December 1988.

Hüseyin Sayram's grandchild is Berlin based German TV correspondent Dr. Iris Sayram.
