= Sairam Iyer =

Indian singer

- Origin: India
- Genres: Indian classical, playback, light music
- Occupation(s): Singer, vocalist
- Instrument: Vocals
- Years active: 1990s–present
- Labels: Saregama, Times Music, Sufiscore
- Website: Sufiscore Profile

Sairam Iyer is an Indian singer, based in Mumbai, India. He has sung in Hindi, Marathi, Telugu, Tamil, and Gujarati languages.

== Career ==
Sairam Iyer was influenced by Lata Mangeshkar and Asha Bhosle. Sairam has been complimented for his dual voice singing ability by music directors in the Hindi film world, such as Naushad, Laxmikant Pyarelal and Kalyanji Anandji (for whose "Little Wonders" Sairam has sung on various occasions). Anil Biswas referred to Sairam as the "Eighth Wonder of the World".

He participated in the Mumbai University's music choir under the choir conductor Kanu Ghosh and, subsequently, was chosen to conduct the choir by Shri Ghosh.

Iyer has done social service and charity work for various causes including aid for earthquake victims, tsunami hit areas and flood victims. He is also involved in a lot of social service activities including Old age homes, Orphanages, Cancer hospitals and Hospices, Home for Blind, Autistic and the Differently Abled.

== Discography ==
=== Albums ===
Title	Details
Mantaram	Released: 1999; Label: Mantram Collection
Aisa Bhi Kabhi Hota Hai	Released: 2000; Label: BMG Crescendo

=== Singles ===
Year	Single title	Language	Label	Notes
2021	Umeed	Hindi	Suficore	
