= Anecdotal cognitivism =

Research method in animal behavior

Anecdotal cognitivism is a method of research using anecdotal, and anthropomorphic evidence through the observation of animal behaviour.

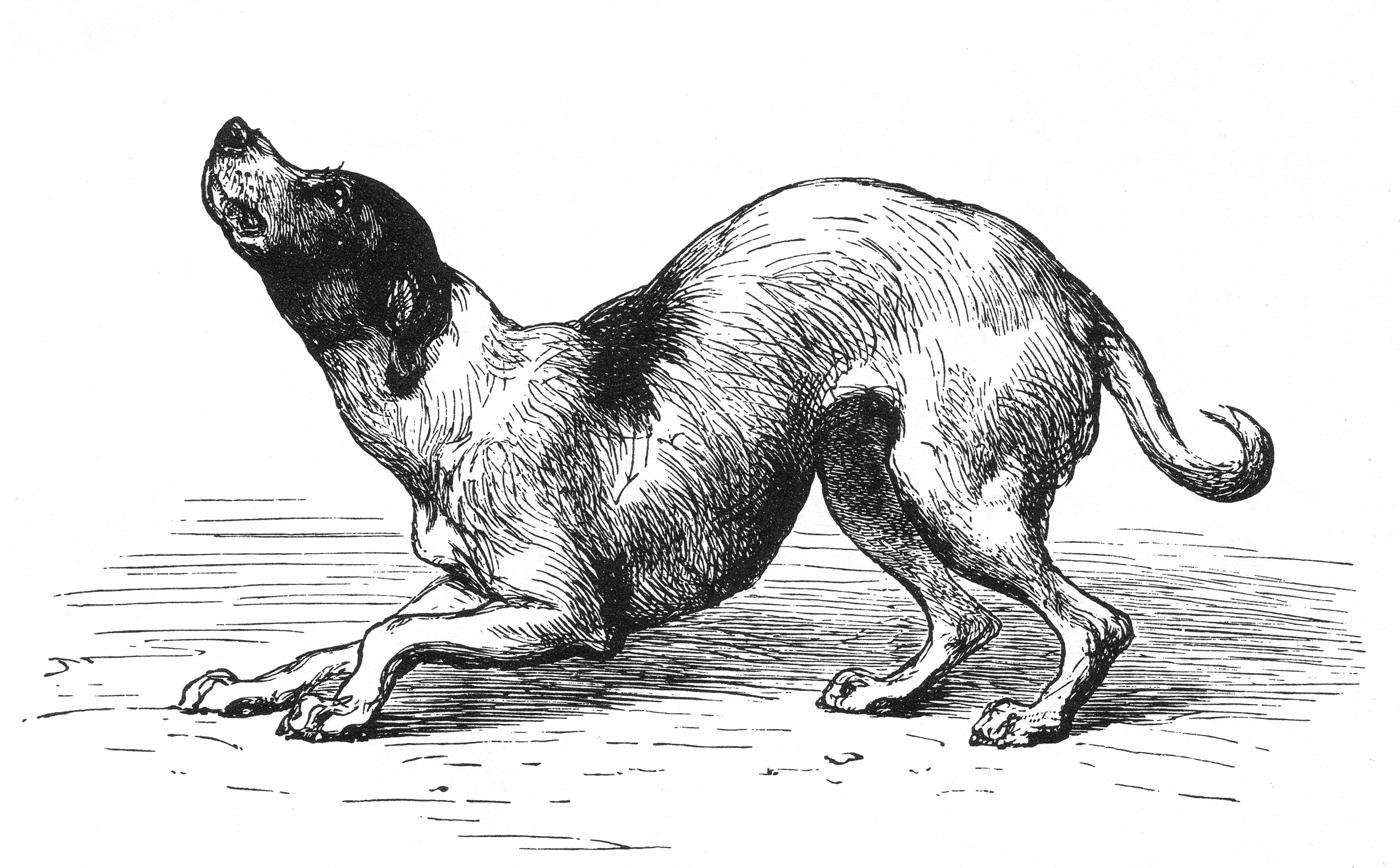
Expression of the Emotions Figure 6

A psychological methodology that attributes mental states to animals on the basis of anecdotes and on the observation of particular cases, other than those observations made during controlled experiments. The purpose is to understand by what means animals interpret external stimuli from the world around them, and subsequently how and why they act on that information. Charles Darwin devised this method in the late nineteenth century, naming it anecdotal cognitivism. This method proved controversial within the academy for the first half of the twentieth century, as Behaviourist methods were favoured at this time. Behaviourists maintain that controlled experiments are necessary to measure stimuli and record observable behaviour. From the middle of the twentieth century ethology and later, cognitive ethology became increasingly important within the scientific and academic milieu.

After the introduction of natural history documentary film production in the 1960s animal behaviour became popular in the general population. Presenters, such as David Attenborough on BBC England and George Page on PBS America, used anecdotes and anthropomorphic rhetoric thus providing access to a wider audience, increasing awareness and interest in animal behaviour and their relationship with humans and nature.

== History ==
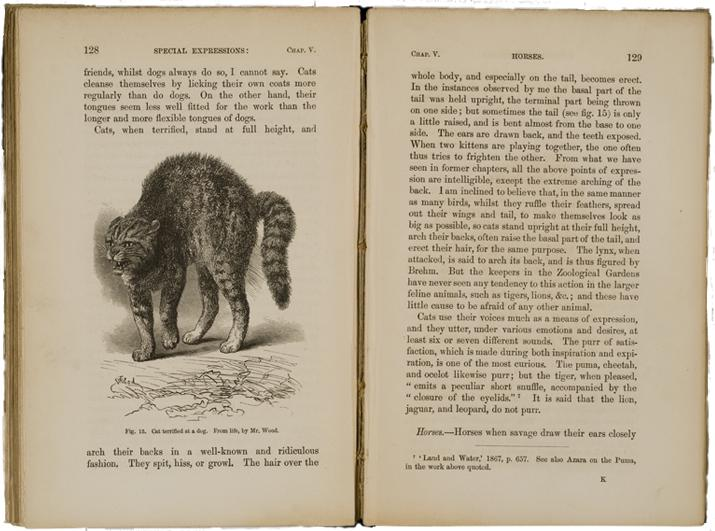
This illustration of feline behaviour is an example of an expression of fear and aggression in "The expression of the emotions in man and animals" by Charles Darwin.

Contemporary scientific interest in animal minds, cognition and behaviour stems from Charles Darwin's nineteenth century seminal text, Theory of Evolution. Rather than showing the reader a series of tables, statistics and diagrams Darwin informed the reader with examples of animal behaviour he collected from both his observations, and the observations of others from all over the world. Anecdotal cognitivism was also practiced in his 1872 publication, The Expression of the Emotions in Man and Animals, with theories relating to the universality and evolution of the facial expressions in animals. Darwin's interest in the mental states of animals instigated the anecdotal cognitivism method which involved collecting stories about animal behaviour from both lay people and amateur naturalists. These stories provided evidence of the cognitive states in particular animal cases. Evidence collected was often from a single witness whose account of the incident may have been second or third hand and was often not from a scientifically trained person.

In the late nineteenth and early twentieth century, anecdotal cognitivism's method was widely criticised in the broader Western scientific community which had come to favour behaviourism. Behaviourism is a cause and effect quantitative data approach and a method scientist argued had greater rigour. Post 1930, anecdotal cognitivism was abandoned for the better part of the twentieth century due to the dominance of the behaviourist approach.

== Methods ==
Many academic disciplines contribute to the study of animal cognition and behaviour. Some example include: animal studies, anthropology, biology, psychology, and philosophy. Within each discipline a range of methodologies are implemented to record research. Two central methods are laboratory experiments to uncover systems and structures of behaviour as used by psychologists, and observational methods are more commonly used by ethologists and biologists to explain evolutionary behaviour.

There are three philosophical issues in studying minds and cognition in animals. Methodological issues, or how to study animal minds, is the philosophical issue relating to anecdotal cognitivism. The other two are foundational issues, whether animals are worthwhile subjects of study and specific issues relating to the different discipline's approaches to methodologies in academia.

== Criticism of anecdotal cognitivism ==
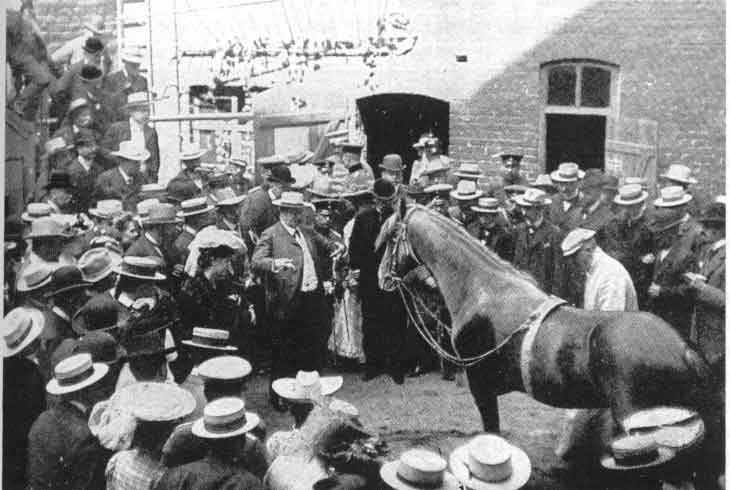
Clever Hans

Anecdotal cognitivism is often criticised by behaviourists for relying on specific cases as evidence of particular animal behaviour, such as that of Clever Hans. Clever Hans was a particularly clever horse, able to interpret his masters body language while carrying out simple arithmetic and answering various simple questions. These involuntary movements made by the owner Mr von Osten, were unconscious and led to the horse being able to correctly answer questions based on the very subtle angle changes of Mr von Osten's head. This case study was often cited by scientists as reasoning against the validity of using this methodology because this singular case was proved to be inaccurate. This exemplified the importance of eradicating unintentional cueing while researching animals and was the argument behaviourists cited for controlled procedures.

== Historical Western theorists ==
=== Supportive of anecdotal cognitivism ===
==== George Romanes: (1848–1894) ====
A protégé of Charles Darwin, George Romanes continued using anecdotal methodologies. Romanes documented an account that exemplifies this methodology, the example; a hunter who had shot and wounded a monkey, this monkey then held his blood-stained hand out to the hunter "to make him feel guilty". As Romanes did not further investigate the anecdotes with test experiments to consider an alternative hypothesis, this method became contentious among his fellow scientists. According to Professor Frans de Waal from Emory University, Romanes reliance on these singular events and Darwin's internal subjective thinking to explain his own research experiences is what led subsequent scientists to favour the behaviourist approach. Behaviourists were also concerned with the lack of statistical information collected with a particular interest in certain behaviours and a perceived bias from subjects whilst relaying their stories.

==== Lloyd Morgan: (1852–1936) ====
Lloyd Morgan, a British psychologist and student of Romanes, removed the anecdotal methodologies from his work to avoid criticism and to ensure an objective systematic speculation and research approach. He was in favour of associating the mental states of animals by interpreting animal behaviour through introspection, though he was cautious of how humans over-intellectualise animal behaviour, as in the case of Clever Hans. In 1894, Morgan developed the methodology that most psychologists now follow, known as Morgan's Canon.

=== Criticism of anecdotal cognitivism ===
The behaviourists' critique of the anecdotal, anthropomorphic methods as subjective, rejected the possibility of internal states in animals, and were more interested in human control over animals than natural behaviour.

==== John B. Watson: (1878–1958) ====
Considered the founder of behaviourism, American psychologist John B. Watson studied animal psychology and was critical of introspective psychology and anecdotal cognitivism. He thought it inferior to objective, observable experiments and did not accept the experimental observer's behaviour could be influenced by the subjective experience. In 1909, at Johns Hopkins School of Medicine's Southern Society for Philosophy and Psychology, Watson stated that "these trends away from introspection will lead psychology toward the perfection of technique of the physical sciences." Later, in 1913 he declared, "never use the term consciousness, mental state, mind, content, introspectively verifiable, imagery and the like...it can be done in terms of stimulus and response, in terms of habit formation, habit integrations and the like."

==== Jacques Loeb: (1859–1924) ====
Loeb, a mechanist physiologist, believed animal behaviour was of no particular purpose or design and could be explained in terms of environmental stimulus. He was known for attentive scientific research and as a founder to behaviourism. Thomas H. Leahey, professor emeritus of Virginia Commonwealth University noted that European physiologists of the early twentieth century including Loeb, "pronounced psychological concepts "superstitions" and found no room for animal consciousness in the explanation of animal behaviour."

==== E. L. Thorndikes: (1874–1949) ====
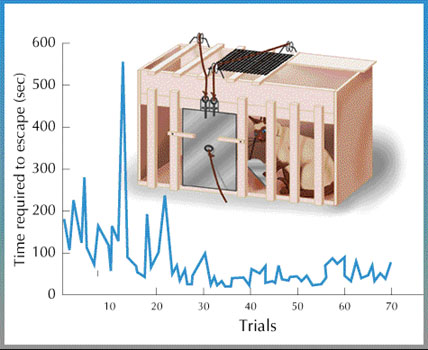
Puzzle box

Both Edward Thorndike's puzzle boxes and PhD thesis, penned in 1898 at Columbia University, were modelled off previous work by Romanes and Morgan. Thorndike expected to assert similar connections to animal learning through imitation and passive tuition as his predecessors. As his extensive laboratory research and observations of cats and dog's ability to escape the boxes came to a close, he found that the research conclusions greatly differed to what he expected (that animals could learn from imitation). This was the beginning of his research into "motor impulse." Thorndike was highly critical of the 'anecdotalist school' and their lack of measurable and scientific methodologies. Thorndike later went on to study The Law of Effect and S-R bonds (Stimulus-Response) and contribute to educational psychology.

==== Burrhus Frederick Skinner: (1904–1990) ====
After WWII, B. F. Skinner's radical behaviourism gained popularity, he "applied [Auguste] Comte's vision to psychology" maintaining that science's goal was to ultimately control society with little need for introspection and maintained that mental processes were unobservable and illegitimate. His theory borrowed some of Darwin's evolutionary theory, though he believed human behaviour was explained through environment. Skinner was focused on a methodology of observation alone. According to Thomas H. Leahey, professor emeritus, Virginia Commonwealth University "Skinner believed that truth is to be found in observations themselves, in "does" and "doesn't" rather than in our interpretations of our observations."

== Non-Western approaches ==
Japan: Studies of Ethology in Japan have regularly used anthropomorphism and anecdotal methods, Japanese culture did not follow the rationalist American behaviourist approach. The cultural differences between the two countries underpin the different methods used to investigate animal behaviour in the academic disciplines. A reason scholars cite for this difference is Japan's spiritual foundation of animism in Shintoism and Buddhism, where animate and inanimate objects have spirits.

== Current discussions ==
Within Classic Ethology, Darwin's anecdotal and anthropomorphic approach was modified by European researchers. Classical Ethologists, Konrad Lorenz (1903–1989) and Niko Tinbergen (1907–1988), undertook a return to Darwin's evolutionary theory and natural history with a reliance on more meticulous anecdotal and anthropomorphic methodologies. The research carried out by both scientists focused on observations, free use of anecdotes and an emphasis on emotion and inner states, "instincts", "drives", "motivational impulses" and "outward flowing nervous energy". In 1973 they were awarded the Nobel Prize with Karl von Frisch (1886–1982) for animal behaviour and were the founders of the field of ethology.

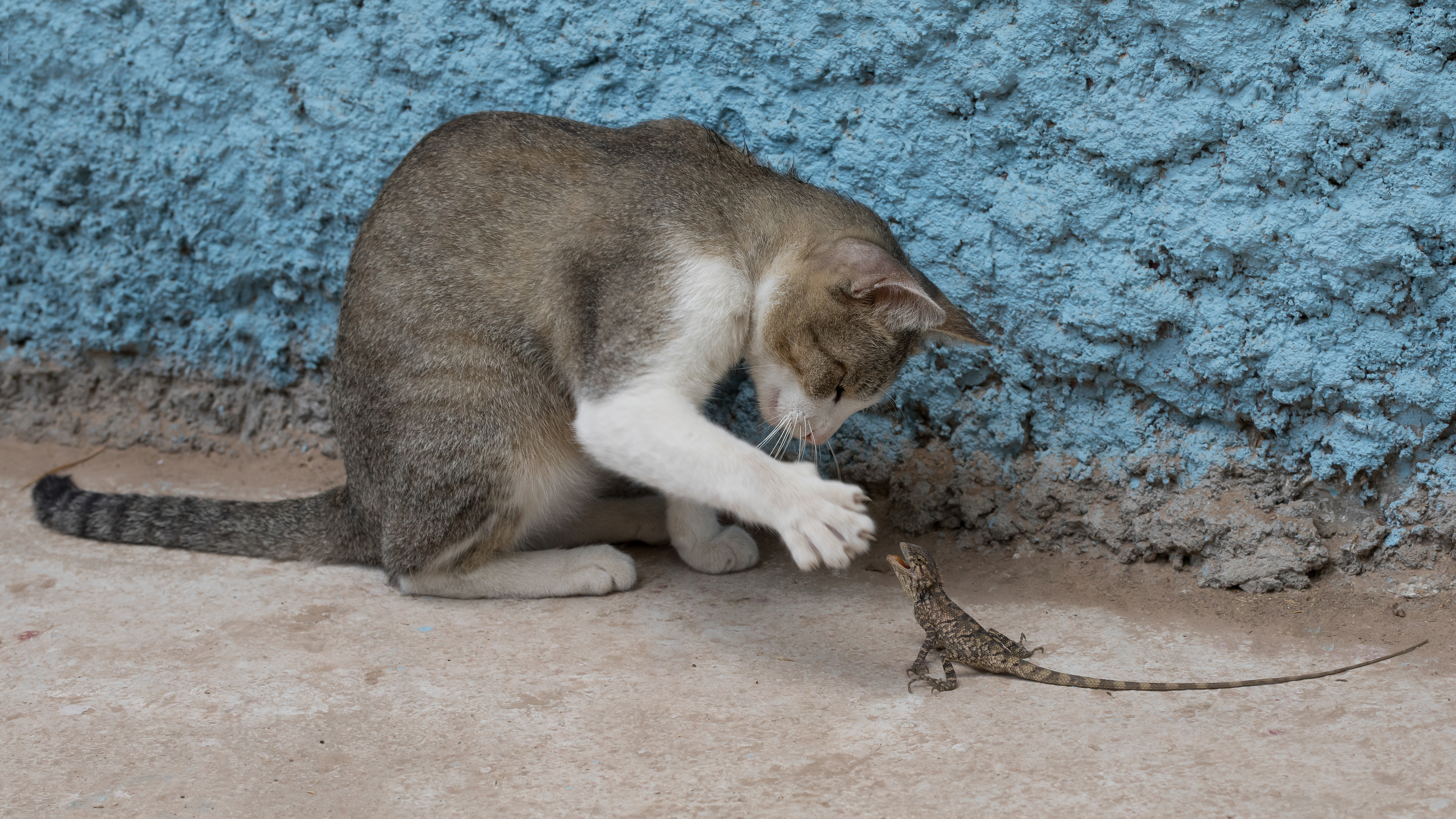
Animal behaviour, curiosity and play between species

Though there are many differences between the schools of behaviourism and ethology, they agreed upon scepticism of the "folk" interpretations of over emphasising anecdotes to explain animal intelligence.

There has been a resurgence in the adaption and use of this method in the twenty-first century. In current research this methodology has evolved and is no longer called 'anecdotal cognitivism,' with the scientific vernacular having changed to 'cognitive ethology' a term coined by Don Griffin, which involves anecdotal and anthropomorphic observations with reference to the cognition, internal states and behaviour analysis of animals. Ethograms, a quantitative method consisting of an inventory table of descriptions, are used to document typical animal behaviour. In unusual or rare animal behaviour, an "incident" or "qualitative report" is written rather than referencing the term "anecdote", due to the negative connotation that resulted from Darwin's method.

== Current theorists' support ==
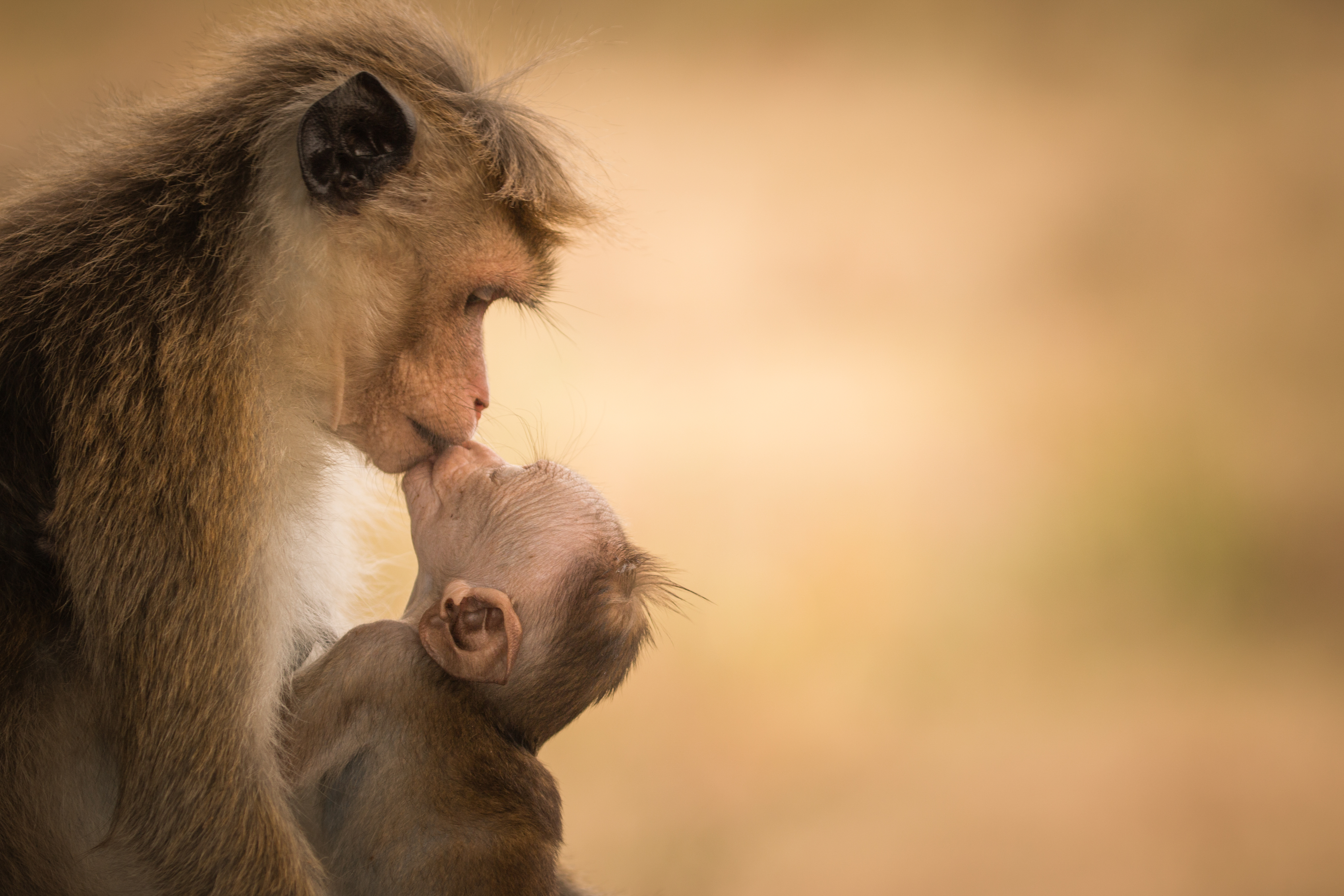
Female Toque macaque with baby – (Harmony of Life)

There has been a significant shift from the behaviourist methodologies, as Professor Frans de Waal states,

"We seek ecological validity in our studies and follow the advice of Uexkull, Lorenz, and Imanishi, who encouraged human empathy as a way to understand other species. True empathy is not self-focused but other-oriented." De Waal also states anecdotes are appropriate to use in contemporary settings as long as they are videoed, or observed by a reputable observer aware and familiar with the animals in question.

This is further evidenced in Sara Shettleworth's work. A professor of ecology and evolutionary biology at the University of Toronto, Shettleworth maintains the most exciting part of current study in animal cognition is detail and subtlety in the human picture of "how other species minds are both like and not like ours."

Emeritus Professor in Animal Behaviour at University of New England, Gisela Kaplan noted the consolatory behaviour of Australian Magpies post conflict exhibited behaviour similar to the image seen in Darwin's crouching dog (figure 6 above), in The Expression of the Emotions in Man and Animals. Using anecdotes, Kaplan said that over several occasions it was noted that the "magpie standing with hunched up wings in a little spatial isolation from the others (presumably the victim)" would be met by a member of the flock that went over and extended its neck over the victim or touched the isolated bird. The isolated bird would "untangle" and after a minute was led back to the group.

There are advantages in the use of historical anecdotal cognitivism from a pedagogical standpoint. The disciplinary objective of anecdotes, as it pertains to the teaching of science, provides the purpose of conveying information and explaining concepts. There are also cultural factors where the anecdotes provide a humanistic perspective to science, and of how science is evaluated and created by the scientists in a social science perspective.

There have been many studies into Darwin's language and writing style. The style Darwin wrote in was seen as accessible prose with regular use of anecdotes and metaphors. This writing style made his texts more widely accessible and was instrumental in them becoming best sellers and popular within the broader community. As stated by Phillip Prodger, Darwin's theories were rapidly accepted by the public due to his writing style, "He wrote in clear, lucid language flavoured with pleasing anecdotes and clear examples."

== Current theorists' criticism ==
Researchers such as Nathan Emery and Nicola Clayton disagree, stating that any use of anecdotes, anthropomorphism and anthropocentrism are inappropriate and must be avoided in the study of animal cognition, citing the Clever Hans experiment and the walnut dropping crow study by Cristol et la. Emery and Clayton state, "Given how easy it is for us, as humans, to place a human perspective on a problem, it may be an especially important caution when studying the mental lives of animals."

== Film industry and popular culture ==
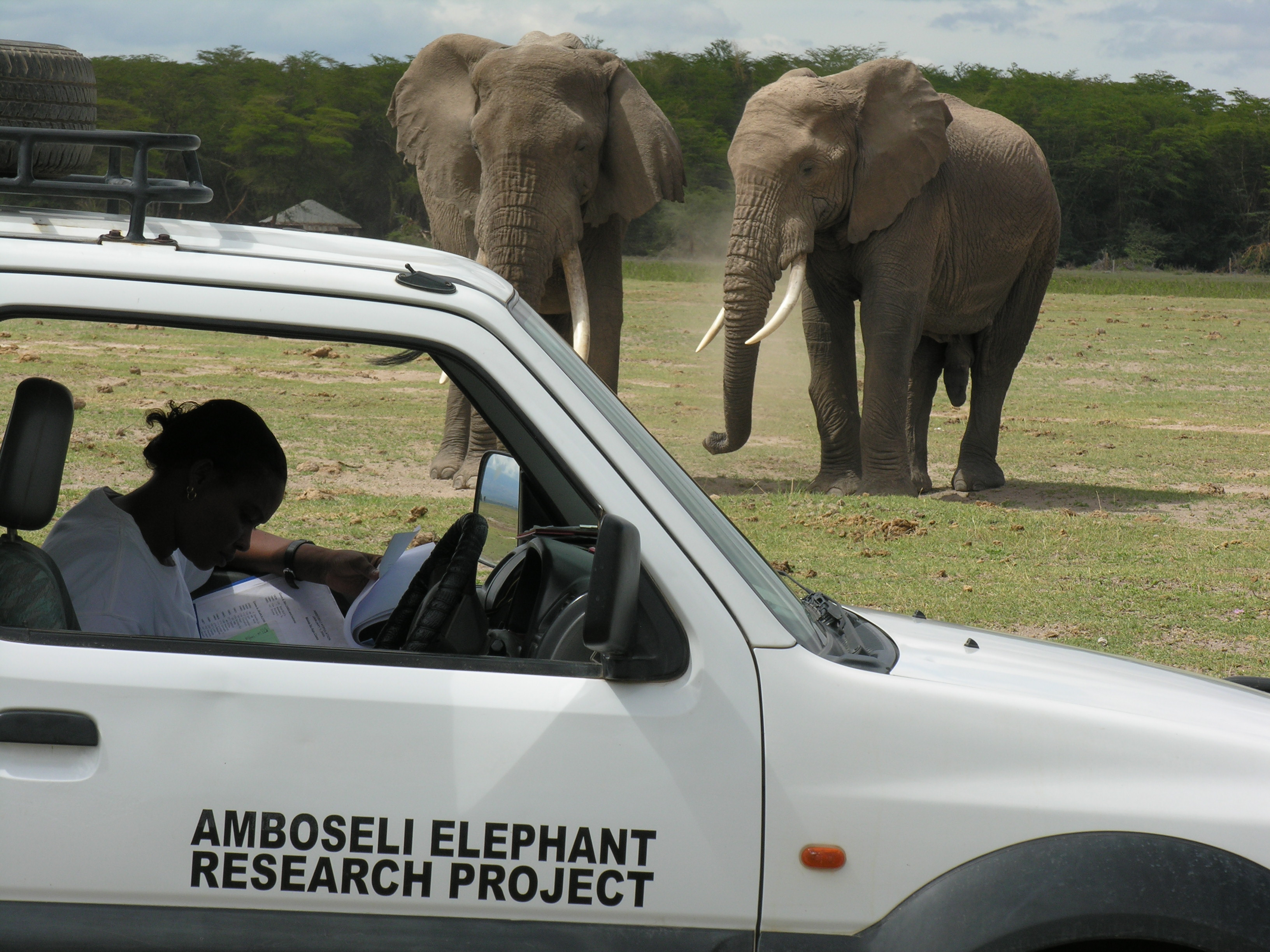
Elephant Study 2 (6987533977)

Documentary film production, a source of education and entertainment popularised by natural history subjects including animal behaviour, became prominent in the later decades of the twentieth century. Natural history films and series, such as David Attenborough's Life on Earth in the 1970s, BBC's Planet Earth II in 2016 and the PBS Nature series by George Page, have contributed to people's awareness of animal behaviour, creating connection to nature and stimulating engagement in the ecological impact of humans on the planet at a time when more people are living in cities, disconnected from nature.

George Page writes of anecdotal cases in Inside the Animal Mind, of primatologist Jane Goodall who cites evidence of emotions and mental states of chimpanzees, who adopt young chimps that are not their own. Also cited are stories of elephant behaviour from ethologist, elephant researcher and founder of Amboseli Elephant Research Project, Cynthia Moss. Moss notes the playful elephant behaviour in a matriarchal environment and contrasts this with the terror observed of elephants witnessing other elephants during a culling. While presenting for Nature, Page heard many stories about this behaviour from scientists, which led Page to believe that science and lay people benefit from greater understanding when anecdotes and anthropomorphic interpretations are allowed to be documented.

== Interesting facts ==
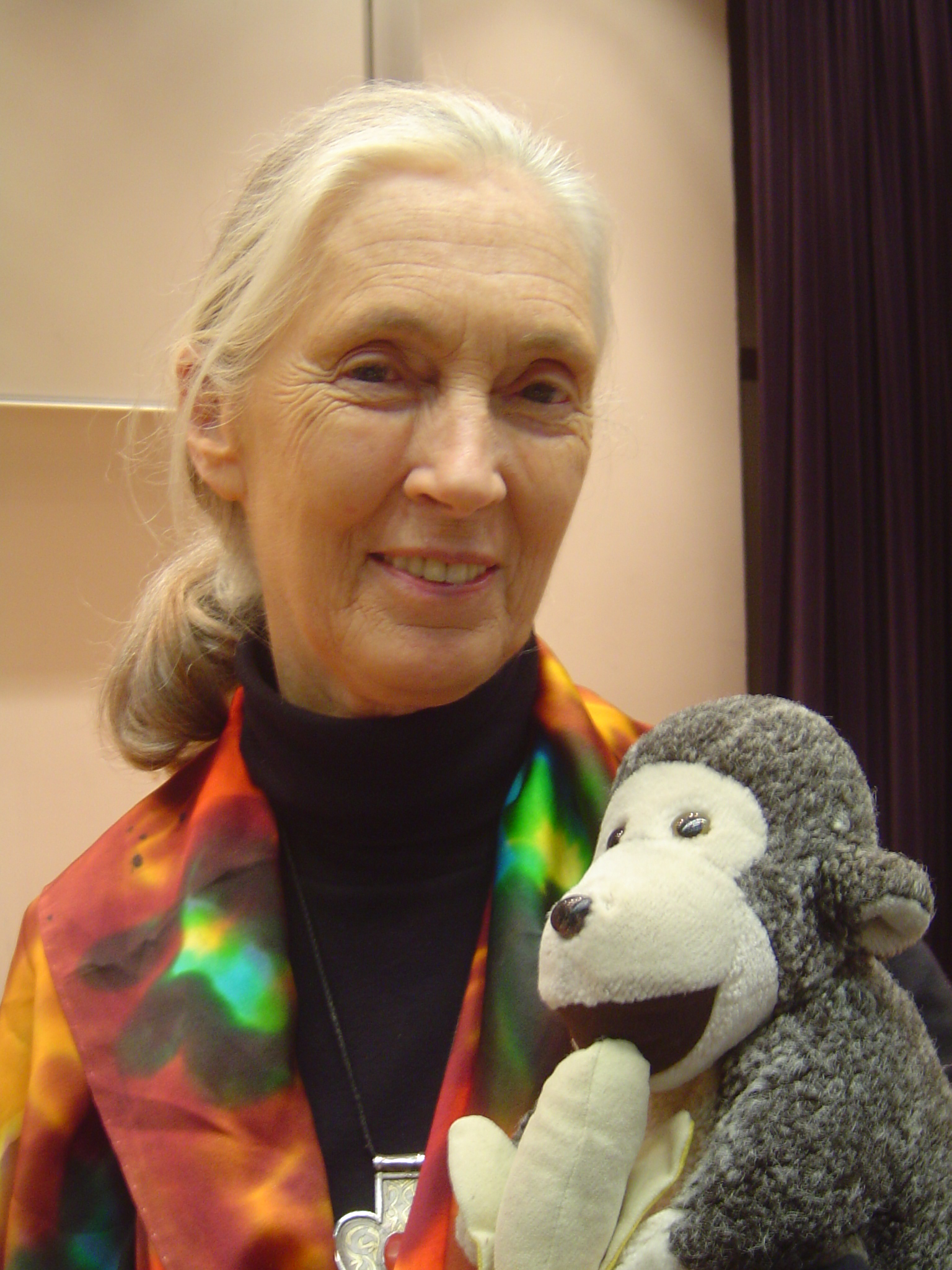
Jane Goodall, primatologist, environmentalist, prominent researcher in chimpanzee behaviour while at Gombe National Park, Tanzania. Jane Goodall is holding her toy monkey "Mr. H", a regular companion during her travels.

Charles Darwin: Darwin had great affection for dogs, owning many in his lifetime. Shelah, Spark and Czar in his teen years, Sappho, Fun, Dash, Pincher and Nina in his early adulthood and when he had his own children Bob, Bran, Quiz, Tartar, Tony, Pepper, Butterton and Polly, whom he regularly incorporated into his studies. In The Expression of the Emotions in Man and Animals, Darwin used anecdotes to explain his theories. Darwin described the 'hothouse face,' an expression Bob, Darwin's pie-bald family dog used expressing dejection when a dog becomes disappointed, expecting a walk that does not materialise. Darwin's later years were spent with Polly, a white terrier, his favourite dog and the last dog he owned. Darwin mentioned Polly in The Expression of the Emotions in Man and Animals as licking his hand with "insatiable passion." Polly was put down by Francis, Darwin's son days after Darwin's fatal heart attack, as Emma Darwin noted "Polly became very ill with a swelling in her throat...creeping away several times as if to die" and was buried in the family garden.

David Attenborough: Attenborough believes the most significant publication on nature and animal behaviour is Charles Darwin's, On the Origin of Species explaining the evolution and natural selection theory foundational to societies' understanding of nature.

Jane Goodall: Goodall, a primatologist, was an unorthodox researcher. Her work led to new discoveries of behaviour in chimpanzee's such as tool use and the primate carnivorous diet. Professor Robert Hinde, research Professor at the University of Cambridge was initially critical of the unconventional methods Goodall employed. Goodall was criticised for naming the chimps she observed at Gombe in Tanzania, she called one David Greybeard and showed photo's of him using tools to access termites at the Zoological Society of London conference in 1962. Goodall was not the only primatologist to name chimps while in the field, biologist Professor George Schaller also named the subjects he studied. Sir Solly Zuckerman, an anatomist at the Zoological Society of London April 1962, criticised Goodall for using anecdotes,

"There are those who are here and who prefer anecdote – and what I must confess I regard as sometimes unbounded speculation, in scientific work it is far safer to base one's major conclusions and generalisations on a concordant and large body of data than on a few contradictory and isolated observations, the explanation of which sometimes leaves a little to be desired."

By observing the chimpanzee troop in their native habitat in the 1960s, Goodall came to the conclusion counter to the scientific community at this time that chimpanzees had distinct personalities and were capable of friendship and altruism. Some behaviours and emotions observed included nervousness, aggression, hugging, kissing, grudges, kicking, punching, subordination to a dominant character and friendship.

Jane Goodall writes about her studies of the Chimpanzee's in Gombe in her book, Reason for Hope, in anthropomorphic terms enabling the reader a more personal understanding of her observations encountered in Tanzania.

== See also ==
- Charles Darwin
- Ethology
- History of Science
