= Lime tree of Macugnaga =

Monumental tree located in the Chiesa Vecchia area

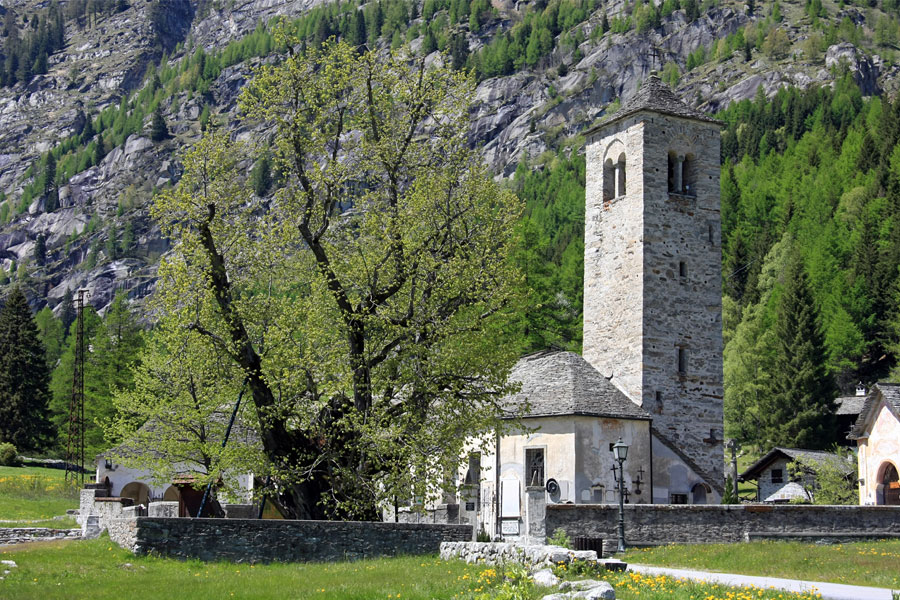
- The centuries-old lime tree of Macugnaga near the Old Church
- Interactive map of Lime tree of Macugnaga
- Species: Tilia platyphyllos
- Location: Chiesa Vecchia, Macugnaga, Piedmont, Italy
- Height: 12 m (39 ft)
- Girth: 8.3 m (27 ft)

The lime tree of Macugnaga (known in Titsch as Alte Lindebum) is a notable monumental tree located in the Chiesa Vecchia area of Staffa, the main settlement of Macugnaga, in Piedmont, northern Italy. Considered an emblematic example of a tree that embodies local identity, it is a symbol of the local Walser community.

== History ==
According to a legend passed down orally within the local community and first recorded in writing in 1842 by the writer Albert Schott, the young tree was brought to the village and planted in the mid-13th century by a woman belonging to the group of Walser shepherds who had founded the settlement. These settlers had arrived in the Anzasca Valley during the first migration from their ancestral homeland.

However, modern estimates have largely challenged the tree's legendary origins. Its actual age remains uncertain, since its now-hollow trunk prevents definitive dendrochronological dating.

The highest estimates suggest that the tree is more than 500 years old, while more conservative assessments place its age at only 200 years. The latter estimates, also considered reliable by the relevant authorities of the Piedmont region, have been strongly disputed by historians. They argue that several paintings dating from the second half of the 19th century, depicting the lime tree alongside the Old Church, demonstrate that the tree was already flourishing and had reached considerable dimensions at that time.

Between 2002 and 2003, several consolidation works were carried out to counteract the ongoing processes of wood decay and stabilise the tree, whose trunk no longer appeared capable of supporting the weight of its main branches. In February 2017, the municipality of Macugnaga requested urgent intervention from the regional authorities because of the tree's deteriorating condition, partly attributed to the declining frequency of maintenance work. In May of the same year, part of the trunk collapsed, although the incident did not compromise the tree's vitality.

The lime tree of Macugnaga is included in the official Italian register of monumental trees under identification number 001/E790/VB/01.

== Description ==
The specimen, belonging to the species Tilia platyphyllos (large-leaved lime), is the largest lime tree in Piedmont. It stands 12 metres (39 ft) tall and has a trunk circumference of 8.3 metres (27 ft).

The trunk rises to a height of 3.5 metres (11 ft) before dividing into five primary branches. It is hollow and affected in several places by wood decay. The side facing the Monte Rosa massif has a large area of necrotic tissue and a scar left by the earlier collapse of a branch.

The main branches are also affected by wood decay, which has necessitated several phytosanitary interventions over the years to stabilise the tree. Where possible, decayed wood has been removed, localised fungicide treatments have been applied, and various supports have been installed to reinforce its structure.

== Folklore ==
Detail of the monumental lime tree's trunk.

In central and northern Europe, the role of community trees was primarily fulfilled by elms and lime trees, the latter being particularly important among Germanic populations. From the 11th century onwards, lime trees in Italy were frequently felled and replaced with species considered more useful, such as oaks and chestnuts. The lime tree of Macugnaga survived this process, possibly because of its location within a Walser community of German cultural tradition.

The tree holds considerable symbolic importance for the inhabitants of Macugnaga, serving as a link between their ancestral homeland and the village where their forebears settled. As a result, questioning the traditions associated with the tree or disputing its age can have an almost iconoclastic significance for the local Walser community, since the lime tree is regarded as a witness to their presence and their historical role in Macugnaga.

According to local tradition, disputes within the community were settled beneath the tree's branches, and meetings of the Walser heads of households were held there. This claim remains disputed among historians. Tullio Bertamini, for example, maintained that no documentary evidence from the early modern period supports the tradition.

The lime tree is also associated with the legend of the Gutwiarghini, whose name translates into Italian as buoni lavoratori ("good workers"). These were gnome-like creatures said to live among the tree's branches, offering wise advice to the villagers, accompanying shepherds to their pastures and guarding the area's rich gold mines.

According to the legend, the Gutwiarghini had feet that pointed backwards. One day, a young female Gutwiarghin was mocked by a child returning from Mass because of this unusual physical characteristic. Deeply offended, she threw a ball of yarn from the branches of the lime tree towards the sky. One after another, all the gnomes climbed the yarn, repeatedly declaring "never again", before disappearing from the village forever.

== See also ==
- List of individual trees

== Bibliography ==
- IPLA – Istituto per le Piante da Legno e l'Ambiente; Università degli Studi di Torino, eds. (2008). Alberi monumentali del Piemonte. Savigliano: L'Artistica. ISBN 9788873201977.
- IPLA; Andrea Ebone; Pier Giorgio Terzuolo; Fabio Giannetti; Mario Palenzona, eds. (2022). Gli alberi monumentali – Conoscenza e cura (PDF). Torino: Centro Stampa della Regione Piemonte. ISBN 9788896046081. Archived from the original (PDF) on 7 November 2024.
- Zanini, Roberta Clara, ed. (2015). Salutami il sasso. Dinamiche della popolazione e della memoria in una comunità alpina di confine. Milano: FrancoAngeli. ISBN 9788891726858.
- Bianchetti, Enrico (1878). L'Ossola inferiore. Notizie storiche e documenti. Torino: Fratelli Bocca.
- Grillo, Paolo (2025). I giganti silenziosi. Il medioevo in dieci alberi. Milano: Mondadori. ISBN 9788835742708.
- Parpagliolo, Luigi (January 1927). "L'albero". Le vie d'Italia (in Italian). Touring Club Italiano: 542–553.
- Club Alpino Italiano (2016). Passeggiate sulle Alpi. Milano: Gazzetta dello Sport. ISBN 9788861268722.
