= Tree volume measurement =

Documentation of tree size

Tree volume is one of many parameters that are measured to document the size of individual trees. Measuring it serves a variety of purposes, some economic, some scientific, and some for sporting competitions. Measurements may include just the volume of the trunk, or the volume of the trunk and the branches depending on the detail needed and the sophistication of the measurement methodology.

Other commonly used parameters, outlined in Tree measurement: Tree height measurement, Tree girth measurement, and Tree crown measurement. Volume measurements can be achieved via tree climbers making direct measurements or through remote methods. In each method, the tree is subdivided into smaller sections, the dimensions of each section are measured and the corresponding volume calculated. The section volumes are then totaled to determine the overall volume of the tree or part of the tree being modeled. In general most sections are treated as frustums of a cone, paraboloid, or neiloid, where the diameter at each end and the length of each section is determined to calculate volume. Direct measurements are obtained by a tree climber who uses a tape to measure the girth at each end of a segment along with its length. Ground-based methods use optical and electronic surveying equipment to remotely measure the end diameters and the length of each section.

The largest trees in the world by volume are all Giant Sequoias in Kings Canyon National Park. They have been previously reported by trunk volume as: General Sherman at 52,508 cubic feet (1,486.9 m^{3}); General Grant at 46,608 cubic feet (1,319.8 m^{3}); and President at 45,148 cubic feet (1,278.4 m^{3}). The largest non-giant Sequoia tree currently standing, Lost Monarch, is, at 42,500 cubic feet (1,200 m^{3}), larger than all but the top five largest living giant sequoias. The Lost Monarch is a Coast Redwood (Sequoia sempervirens) tree in Northern California that is 26 feet (7.9 m) in diameter at breast height (with multiple stems included), and 320 feet (98 m) in height. In 2012 a team of researchers led by Stephen Sillett did a detailed mapping of the branches of the President tree and calculated the volume of the branches to be 9,000 cubic feet (250 m^{3}). This would raise the total volume for the President from 45,000 cubic feet to 54,000 cubic feet (1,500 m^{3}) surpassing the volume of the General Grant Tree. The branch volume of the General Grant and General Sherman Trees have yet to be measured in this detail.

== Direct volume measurements – trunk ==
Tree climbers can physically measure the height and circumference of a tree using a tape. The distance from the highest climb point and the top of the tree is measured using a pole that extends from the tree top to the anchor point of the tape. This height is noted and the diameter of the tree is measured at that point. The climber then rappels down the tree measuring the trunk circumference by tape wrap at different heights with the height of each measurement referenced to the fixed tape running down the trunk.

Direct trunk measurements are obtained by a tree climber. The climber will ascend into the tree until he reaches the highest safe climbing point. Once this point is reached, the climber drops a weighted throw line straight to the ground. A measuring (reference) tape is then attached via a small carabineer to the dropped throw line and pulled up to the top, following the vertical path of the weight's descent. The tape is affixed to the trunk at this point via several thumbtacks at this point and allowed to hang freely down the trunk. The exact position of the tack relative to the top of the tree is noted. If the top of the tree was not safely reachable a pole or stick is used to assist in measuring the remaining distance to the high point of the tree.

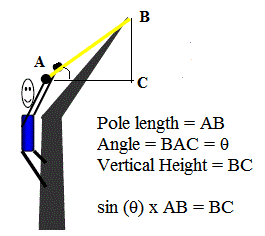
Tree Top Measurement

The climber pulls up an extendable pole and uses it to reach to the top of the tree from the point at the upper end of the tape. If not vertical, the slope of the leaning pole is measured and the length of the pole is measured. The vertical distance added by the pole to the tape length is (sin Θ x pole length). The lower end of the tape is terminated at the base of the tree. If on sloping ground this is the mid-slope point between the lowest and highest sides of the tree. The total height of the tree is equal to the measured distance from the base at mid-slope to the upper end of the tape where affixed to the tree plus the vertical height measured to the actual top of the tree. Girth measurements are made by wrapping the tape around the tree perpendicular to the bole at successive intervals as the climber rappels down the tree. All points of measurement are referenced for height above ground as measured on the fixed reference tape. Measurement intervals are subjectively chosen based on changes in trunk taper. An area where a change in profile is observed (in or out) is measured with a tape. Clear sections of trunk are selected so as to not include branch collars, burls, etc. For greatest accuracy, measurements are taken on single-trunked trees at no more than 10-foot (3.0 m) intervals. Additional measurements are generally required where the trunk branches or bifurcates or where there are trunk reiterations.

Reiterations are identified by an upturned branch that had gained apical dominance and formed an additional branch supporting trunk. Reiteration lengths are terminated at the point of trunk contact. Trunk reiterations are measured and added to the final trunk volume. A bifurcation is defined as a split or fork in the trunk that forms two or more often similarly sized ascending trunks. Bifurcations often form an irregularly shaped fused section that cannot be accurately measured with a tape for the purpose of computing cross-sectional area. All bifurcation lengths are terminated at estimated pith origination from the main stem.

=== Frame mapping ===
As part of the Tsuga Search Project, a frame mapping technique was developed to allow characterization of significantly large fusion areas at forks in the trees. With two climbers, each on opposite sides of the tree, an area of fusion is selected to be measured. Two poles, longer than the diameter of the fused section, are lifted in place and connected by a thin rope threaded through opposite ends so they are adjustable. The poles are temporarily tensioned and the distance between the ends measured. Adjustments are made until they are parallel and perpendicular to the axis of the trunk. The slight tension between the poles holds them steady against the trunk. Tents stakes wedged in the bark can also be used to level and steady the frame. One end is designated the y axis, and the adjacent side the x axis. Measurements are made with a carpenters tape from the frame to the edge of the trunk and the profile of the trunk shape is plotted. The data is then entered into a trapezoidal area function in a spreadsheet and converted into cross sectional area so as to calculate the equivalent circumference to use in the volume formula.

=== Footprint mapping ===
Many trees flare outward significantly at the base and this basal wedge has a complex surface of bumps and hollows. This becomes an even more complex volume in trees growing on a slope. Approximations of the volume of this basal segment using best estimates of the effective diameters exhibited may be used in many cases. In other cases footprint mapping is an option. In footprint mapping a level, rectangular reference frame is placed around the base of the tree, to create a horizontal plane. The position of the multiple points on the trunk surface is measured with respect to the frame and plotted. This process repeated at different heights creating a series of virtual slices at different heights. The volume of each individual slice is then calculated and all are added together to determine the volume of the basal wedge.

== Remote volume measurements – trunk ==
Remote measurements of trunk volume are usually made from a position on the ground where the observer has a clear view of the entire length of the trunk. Measurements may be made using professional surveying equipment such as a total station or an instrument such as the Criterion RD1000, using a combination of a monocular w/reticle, laser rangefinder, and clinometer, using photographic methods combined with a laser rangefinder and clinometer, or by using cloud mapping techniques.

Electronic surveying instruments such as a total station allows the observer to measure the position of each diameter measurement and the length of the trunk section between each measurement. With most of the instruments, the diameter is determined by measuring the angle of azimuth between the opposite sides of the trunk. Laser-measured distances to the sides of the trunk representing the ends of the diameter and the included angle are used with the law of cosines to calculate the diameter. The Criterion RD 1000 has a special feature that allows the diameter to be measured through a visible display. These length and diameter values then can be used to determine the volume of the individual section.

Another technique is available for those who possess instruments that will measure horizontal angles. The following diagram shows how to measure diameter remotely using a laser rangefinder to shoot the distance to the middle of the trunk and a transit or compass or another device to measure the horizontal angle created by the diameter. Note that in this method, the measurer shoots to the middle of the trunk instead of either edge. Also, the full diameter does not have to be visible from the point of measurement. It is a common misconception that closer distances lead to errors because the measurer cannot see the full diameter. However, if the trunk is round, closeness is not a factor. In the diagram d = diameter, D = distance from measurer to middle of the tree, a = angle from the middle to the edge of the trunk. A variation of this method is to measure the complete angle taken up by the image of the trunk and divide it by 2 to get angle a.

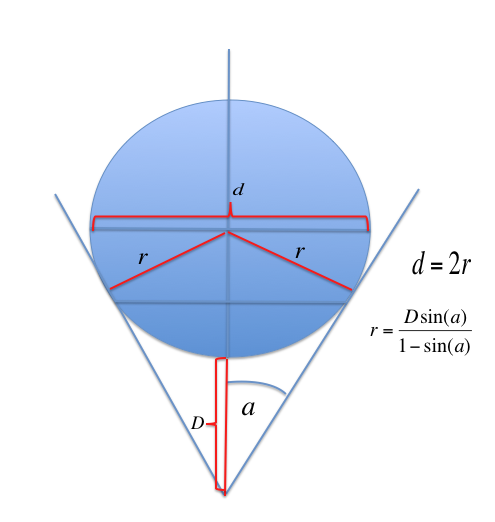
Trunk diameter measurement

A combination of a monocular w/reticle, laser rangefinder, and a clinometer can be used to do go from simple diameters to a full measure of trunk volume. A monocular w/reticle is a small telescope with an internal scale visible through the glass. The monocular is mounted on a tripod and the trunk of the tree is sighted through the monocular. The width of the trunk is measured as so many units of the reticle scale. The height above, or distance below, instrument and distance of the target point is measured using the laser rangefinder and clinometer. The distance is measured to the center (side) of the tree. With the distance known, the diameter of the tree measured expressed as units of the reticle scale, and an optical scaling factor for the monocular w/reticle, provided by the diameter of the tree at that point can be calculated:

diameter = (reticle scale) × (distance to target) ÷ (optical factor)

To assure accuracy, the calibration of the optical factor should be checked for each instrument rather than solely relying upon the manufacturer's specifications.

A series of tree diameters up the trunk of the tree are systematically measured using this procedure from the base of the tree to the top and their height is noted. Diameters can sometimes be measured with the monocular w/reticle in sections where it is difficult to obtain accurate laser distances because intervening thin brush or branches. Distances to the obscured section may be interpolated from measurements made above and below the obscured section.

Some photographic methods are being developed to allow calculation of diameters of trunk and limb segments in photographs that contain a scale of known size and where distance to the target is known. Essentially, the camera is treated as if it were a monocular w/reticle and the "optical factor" for the camera at a particular focal length is calculated for each photograph based upon the size of a reference scale and its distance from the camera. The scale need not be present in every image of an individual tree so long as the focal length has not been changed between images. Using this principle a shot can be made of each measurement point through an enlarged image to make the girth measurements easier and more accurate. In addition, this allows the central, less optically distorted portion of the image to be used for the measurements. The measured diameter of the almost cylindrical section is not going to vary significantly with viewing angle. Using data from clinometer and distance measurements at each end of a segment, the height, length, and distance of intermediate points can be calculated and the trunk diameters at these points can be measured. One advantages of the photographic method is the ubiquity of the digital camera. In addition, once the framework data is measured in the field, the trunk diameter measurement process can be done later on a computer. The photographic image can be also easily be re-measured if an error is encountered in the calculations.

Point cloud mapping is a process being developed by Michael Taylor using optical parallax scanning technology whereby thousands of measurements are made around the trunk of a tree. These can be used to recreate a three-dimensional model of the trunk and volume data is among the values that can be calculated. There are a handful of widely available technologies including ground LIDAR) and optical parallax scanners that can quickly and accurately map a trunk. LIDAR has the best range. The problem is in a cluttered forest environment you get a lot of 'noise' and unwanted cloud points, hundreds of thousands potentially, but these can be filtered out. The surface of tree trunks can be mapped using an optical scanner which measures pixel off-set ratio between a digital camera focal center and line laser projection and blends with photo pixel data. Taylor reports this optical data can be supplemented using a system such as an Impulse200LR laser and Mapsmart software to target tight areas where cloud density is low and/or not reachable by optical scanning technology, provided a properly scaled skeleton framework is established with the MapSmart/Impulse200 combination first. The data can be saved as a .ply file which can be viewed and manipulated with a variety of software packages including the free open source 3D graphics viewer Meshlab. There are several software programs available that can be used to calculate the volume of the space defined by the point cloud including some tree specific currently under development.

Currently only the lower portions of the trunks of tree have been successfully mapped using point cloud mapping technology, but various options to map the entire trunk length of these trees are being evaluated. The point cloud mapping of the base of these trees can quickly create a 3D representation of the base of these large trees in much more detail than can be practically obtained through traditional footprint mapping.

== Limb and branch volume measurements ==
Limb and branch volumes present significant challenges. Not only must the girths of each end of the branch segment be measured, but the length of the limb segment must be determined as well for limbs oriented in different directions. The collected information must further be organized to assure that each section has been measured and none have been measured twice. The length and diameter measurements of the limbs can be accomplished by climbers physically measuring these values, or through remote methods, or a combination of both. In most cases the branch diameters are only measured down to a certain lower size limit, and the volume of the remaining finer branches is ignored, or extrapolated.

The volume of the limbs and branches can be significant. For example, the Middleton Live Oak (Quercus virginiana), height 67.4 feet, dbh 10.44 feet, crown spread 118 feet) was found to have a trunk volume of 970 ft^{3} (27 m^{3}) and a branch volume of 3,850 ft^{3} (109 m^{3}) The branch volume was almost 4x that of the trunk. In contrast the volume of the Sag Branch Tuliptree (Liriodendron tulipifera), height 167.7 feet, dbh 7.08 feet, crown spread 101 feet) had a trunk volume of 2,430 ft^{3} (69 m^{3}) and a branch volume of 1,560 ft^{3} (44 m^{3}). The volume of the branches on the tuliptree was only 64.2% that of the trunk. The President Tree (Sequoiadendron giganteum) [3] was measured in 2012 to have a trunk volume of 54,000 cubic feet (1,500 m^{3}) of wood and a branch volume of 9,000 cubic feet (250 m^{3}) of wood in the branches. In this giant tree the branch volume was only 16.7% that of the trunk volume. In many trees with smaller or fewer large branches the branch volume may average as low as 5–10% of the trunk volume.

Detailed three-dimensional mapping of the trunk and major branches of trees can be done for significant specimens. The methodology used to map the Middleton Oak and the Sag Branch Tuliptree was developed by Dr. Robert Van Pelt. This process is called canopy mapping. It may be used to measure branch volume from within the tree itself for exception or complex trees. Ground based measurements may also be made where the branches can be adequately traced within the crown of the tree.

=== Canopy mapping ===
Canopy mapping is the process whereby the positions and size of the branches within the canopy are mapped in three-dimensional space. It is a labor-intensive process that usually reserved for only the most significant specimens. This is usually done from a set position or a series of positions within the tree. Sketches and photographs are used to facilitate the process. Trees are climbed and the overall architecture is mapped including the location of the main stem and all reiterated trunks, in addition to all branches that originate from trunks. The position of every branch point in the canopy down to a certain size and also the positions of various reiterations, breaks, kinks, or any other eccentricities in the tree are also mapped. Each mapped trunk and branch is measured for basal diameter, length, and azimuth. Specific circumferences and other features within the tree are measured by climbers.

Van Pelt et al. (2004) outlined the process in Quantifying and Visualizing Canopy Structure in Tall Forests: Methods and a Case Study. In the example he used a LTI Criterion 400 Laser Survey instrument to map the tree canopies. It is essentially a device that includes a laser-rangefinder, clinometer, and a compass. The LTI Criterion 400 uses an infrared semi-conductor laser diode for slope distance measurement. A vertical tilt-sensing encoder provides vertical inclination, while a fluxgate electronic compass measures magnetic azimuth, completing the data required to establish a point's three-dimensional location in space. It is used to map the position of every branch point in the canopy down to a certain size and also the positions of various reiterations, breaks, kinks, or any other eccentricities in the tree. This is usually done from a set position or a series of positions within the tree. Sketches and photographs are used to facilitate the process. Trees were climbed and the architecture mapped in accordance with criterion previously established. This involves mapping the location of the main stem and all reiterated trunks, in addition to all branches that originate from trunks. Each mapped trunk and branch was measured for basal diameter, length, azimuth, Climbers measure specific circumferences and detail other features within the tree. In addition a footprint map of the base of the tree is made to calculate the exact volume of the basal section of the tree. The data is processed in Excel to generate a volume calculation. Graphing functions can be used to create a 3-dimensional figure of the tree data. Dr. Van Pelt also uses an Excel macro to rotate the image so that it can be viewed from different angles. In the cases of the Middleton Live Oak and Sag Branch Tulip each of the trees were mapped from a single set station from within the canopy of each tree.

=== Ground-based measurements ===
Ground based measurements can be used to measure the limb length and diameters of branch sections remotely through the use of a monocular w/reticle or photographic analysis. Where the trunk itself is sloping away from vertical, additional measurements need to be made to determine the true length of each trunk segment rather than simply treating it as a vertical column. The length of a segment can be determined by measuring the position of the end points of the branch in 3-dimensional space from an external reference position. The length is then calculated by applying Pythagorean's Theorem. The following diagram illustrates the process.

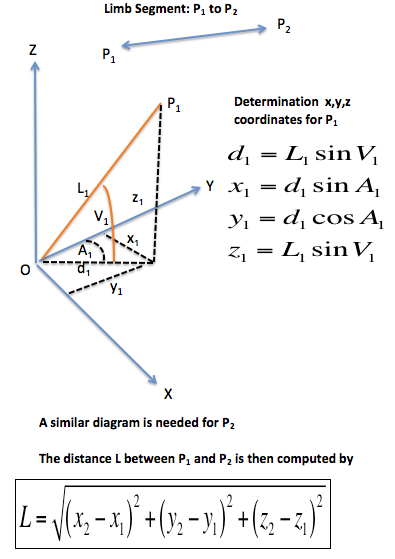
Three dimensional coordinate calculations

From the external reference position O, the direct distance to L_{1} is measured to P_{1} along with the vertical angle V_{1} and azimuth A_{1}. The coordinates x_{1}, y_{1}, and z_{1} are then computed. The same process is followed for P_{2}. This sequence is carried out as follows: The horizontal distance d_{1} from the initial reference point O to a target point P_{1} is computed as d_{1} = cos(inclination) × laser distance = L_{1}sin V_{1} The value of x at the first point is: x_{1} = sin(azimuth) × horizontal distance = d_{1}sin A_{1} The value of y at the first point is: y_{1} = cos(azimuth) × horizontal distance = d_{1}cos A_{1} The value of z at the first point is: z_{1} = sin(inclination) × laser distance = L_{1}sin V_{1} This process is repeated for P_{2} to get x_{2}, y_{2}, z_{2}. The final step is to compute the distance from P_{1} to P_{1}(L) using the following formula.

$$L = \sqrt{(x_2-x_1)^2 + (y_2 - y_1)^2 + (z_2 - z_1)^2}$$

Note that the computation involves squaring the changes in the x, y, and z values, adding these squares together and taking the square root of the sum.

Leverett has developed a methodology where the length of a limb is measured using a monocular w/reticle aligned along the orientation of the limb, the distance to either end of the limb segment, and a calculated scaling factor to determine limb length. Essentially the apparent length of the limb at each end as using the distance to that point and the scaling factor for that distance as if the limb were perpendicular to the observer. These lengths are considered to be the top and base of a regular trapezoid with a height equal to the difference in the distance between the two points. The true length of the limb can then be calculated by treating it as a diagonal of the trapezoid.

== Volume calculations ==
To calculate trunk volume, the tree is subdivided into a series of segments with the successive diameters being the bottom and top of each segment and segment length being equal to the difference in height between the lower and upper diameters, or if the trunk is not vertical, the segment length can be calculated using the limb length formula above. Whether using the aerial or ground-based methods, the diameter or girth measurements do not need to be evenly spaced along the trunk of the tree, but a sufficient number of measurements need to be taken to adequately represent the changes in diameter of the trunk. Cumulative trunk volume is calculated by adding the volume of the measured segments of the tree together. Where segments are short, the volume of each segment is calculated as the volume of a frustum of a cone where volume is calculated by any of the three forms:

$$\begin{align}
\text{volume} & = \frac{\pi h(r_1^2 + r_2^2 +r_1 r_2)} 3 \\[4pt]
\text{volume} & = \frac{\pi h (D_1^2 + D_2^2 +D_1 D_2)}{12} \\[4pt]
\text{volume} & = \frac{h \left(A_1 + A_2 + \sqrt{A_1 A_2} \right)} 3
\end{align}$$

where

r_{1}, r_{2} are the radii of the top and bottom circular cross-sections,
D_{1}, D_{2} are the diameters of the top and bottom circular cross-sections,
A_{1}, A_{2} are the areas of the top and bottome circular cross-sections.

A similar, but more complex formula can be used where the trunk is significantly more elliptical in shape where the lengths of the major and minor axis of the ellipse are measured at the top and bottom of each segment.

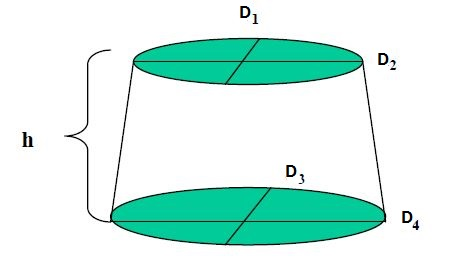

Let D_{1} = major axis of upper ellipse of the frustum

D_{2} = minor axis of upper ellipse of the frustum
D_{3} = major axis of lower ellipse of the frustum
D_{4} = minor axis of lower ellipse of the frustum
h = height of frustum
V = volume of frustum
π = 3.141593

Then

$$\text{volume} = \frac{\pi h \left(D_1 D_2 + D_3 D_4 + \sqrt{ D_1 D_2 D_3 D_4 } \right)}{12}$$

While this formula is more involved than the equivalent for a circle, if the major and minor axes of each ellipse are equal, the result is the more familiar formula for the frustum of a right circular cone.

The volume calculations for these individual frustums of trunk segments can be further refined by considering the overall shape of the trunk. Tree trunks change shape, or more appropriately, curvature multiple times from base to top. It is not uncommon to see the base of a tree as neiloid in shape for 3 to 10 feet. This neiloid shape then changes to a cylinder or paraboloid for perhaps several tens of feet and then to a cone for the remaining distance.

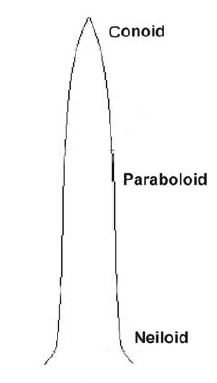
Tree shape with height

The best method for modeling that is to divide the trunk into adjacent segments no more than 3 to 5 feet in height/length and then apply either the cone, paraboloid, or neiloid frustum form to each. This is a labor-intensive process. To gain efficiency, longer sections can be chosen that appear to the eye to have uniform curvature. However, the longer the segment, the more important it is to choose the optimum solid. Over longer frustums, the greater volume contribution of the paraboloid or the lesser volume of the neiloid becomes apparent when compared to the basic conical form. Therefore, when modeling longer frustums the measurer needs to perform independent checks to ensure that the right solid has been chosen. One way to check is to take a diameter measurement at an intermediate point and then project what the diameter would be for the chosen model at the point. If the projected diameter is substantially greater or lesser than the measured diameter, then the selected solid is not the right choice. In this case, an intermediate form that combines the two forms through weighting may be appropriate. The measurer selects weights and applies them to each solid formula to arrive at an intermediate result. Each frustum can represent a different parent cone, paraboloid, or neiloid so that there is not a need to impose a single form on the entire tree.

The formula for the volume of a frustum of a paraboloid is: V = (πh/2)(r_{1}^{2} + r_{2}^{2}), where h = height of the frustum, r_{1} is the radius of the base of the frustum, and r_{2} is the radius of the top of the frustum. This allows us to use a paraboloid frustum where that form appears more appropriate than a cone. Frustums are then dictated by visual inspection.

As an extension of this approach, the neiloid form is one whose sides are concave, so its volume is less than that of a cone. The neiloid form often applies near the base of tree trunks exhibiting root flare, and just below limb bulges. The formula for the volume of a frustum of a neiloid: V = (h)[A_{b} + (A_{b}^{2}A_{u})^{1/3} + (A_{b}A_{u}^{2})^{1/3} + A_{u}], where A_{b} is the area of the base and A_{u} is the area of the top of the frustum. This volume may also be expressed in terms of radii:

$$V=\left(\frac h 4 \pi\right)\left(r_b^2+r_b^{4/3}r_u^{2/3}+r_b^{2/3}r_u^{4/3} + r_u^2 \right).$$

The final tree volume is the sum of the volumes for the individual frustum sections for the trunk, the volumes of sections measured as bifurcations, the volume of the basal flare, the volume of miscellaneous unusual sections, and the volumes of the limbs (if applicable.)

== Volume changes over time ==
Forestry data suggests that the slowdown of diameter growth is correlated to a commensurate slowdown in volume growth, but the association is not always straightforward. Diameter represents linear growth and volume is growth within a three-dimensional context. Slowdown in radial growth rates can occur without slowdown in corresponding cross-sectional area or volume growth. Leverett compared growth rates of six young white pines (Pinus strobus), 75 to 90 years in age, growing along Broad Brook, MA with that of eleven old growth white pines from various other forest sites around Massachusetts. As anticipated, the smaller trees grow at a higher relative rate, but their actual volume increase is less than the larger trees with an average annual trunk volume increase is 6.76 ft^{3} (0.191 m^{3}).

Some of the older Mohawk Trail State Forest pines in western Massachusetts are growing at a rate of slightly less than double the rate of the young pines in terms of absolute volume increases with an average annual volume increase of 11.9 ft3 over the referenced time periods. The Ice Glen pine, in Stockbridge, Massachusetts, estimated to be around 300 years old or possibly older based on dating of nearby pines, shows a decline in annual volume increase to approximately half of that for the trees in the 90 to 180-year age class, but still averaged a volume increase of 5.8 ft^{3} over the five year monitoring period. This study shows that these old trees continue to add significant volume even into old age.

== Trunk shape over time ==
Tree trunks not only vary in shape from top to bottom, but also vary in shape over time. The overall shape of a tree trunk can be defined as a form factor: V = F · A · H, where A = area of the base at a designated height (such as 4.5 feet), H = full height of tree, and F = the form factor. Examinations of white pines samples in Massachusetts found a sequence of progressive changes in shape over time. Young pines were found to have a form factor between 0.33 and 0.35, forest grown pines in the age class of 150 years or more had a form factor of between 0.36 and 0.44, and stocky old-growth outlier pines would on occasion achieve a form factor of between 0.45 and 0.47. The form factor concept is parallel to idea of percent cylinder occupation. The volume of the trunk is expressed as a percentage of the volume of a cylinder that is equal in diameter to the trunk above basal flare and with a height equal to the height of the tree. A cylinder would have a percent cylinder occupation of 100%, a quadratic paraboloid would have 50%, a cone would have 33%, and a neiloid would have 25%. For example, the old growth hemlock trees (Tsuga canadiensis) measured as part of the Tsuga Search Project were found to have occupation percentages from 34.8% to 52.3% for the intact, single trunked trees sampled. In general trees with a fat base or a trunk that quickly tapers scores low on the list, while trees that taper more slowly have higher values. Those trees with broken tops will have anomalously high values. If the base diameter is taken within the area of basal flare the overall volume will be anomalously low.

== Basic volume estimates ==
One goal of looking at overall tree shape is to find a method of determining overall tree volume using a minimum of measurements and a generalized volume formula. The simplest method to achieve this is to model the entire trunk with one application of a solid. Application of one form to the whole tree has been discussed as a way to get a quick volume approximation. But, the method is unlikely to produce an accurate result.

Given the general form changes from the base to top of the tree and the pattern of change in form factor over time, a predictive model was developed and applied to a variety of trees in New England where volume estimates were made based upon measurements tree height, girth at breast height, girth at root flair, and assigned values for form factor (taper), and a flare factor. For young to mature Eastern White Pines, applying the cross-sectional area at trunk flare with full tree height in the cone formula almost always overstates the fully modeled volume. Similarly, using the cross-sectional area at breast height with full tree height in the cone formula usually understates the volume. These values provide an upper and lower bound for actual volume for younger trees. Old-growth pines can develop a columnar form, and if they have only a modest root flare, the actual trunk volume can exceed the volume as estimated by the upper bound formula. In an analysis of 44 trees, including 42 eastern white pines, one Eastern Hemlock, and a single Tuliptree, the average of the upper and lower-bound volumes as compared to the modeled volume shows that the average divided by the modeled volumes is 0.98 with a standard deviation of 0.10. The volumes of 34 trees fall within the hypothetical upper and lower-bound calculations.

Better results can be obtained using subjectively assigned factors to incorporate the taper of the trunk and characterize the basal flare. Trees with major root flare or pronounced taper skew the formula. Extreme root flare produces noticeable overestimates of volume. Conversely, a rapid trunk taper leads to an estimated volume that is too low. This can be addressed if we create multipliers for the averaged volume: one for flare and one for taper. If, by visual inspection, we see a large flare, we could use a flare multiplier of 0.90, otherwise 1.00. If we saw a very slow taper, we could use a taper multiplier of 1.11. By using separate factors for flare and taper and multiplying them together to create a composite factor.

$$V = F_1 F_2 H\left(C_1^2 + \frac{C_2^2}{75.4} \right)$$

where C_{1} = circumference at root flare, C_{2} = circumference at 4.5 feet, H = full tree height, F_{1} = flare factor, F_{2} = taper factor, and V = volume. Any objection to this equation rests primarily with the subjective nature of F_{1} and F_{2}. The value 75.4 = 24π, where 24π substitutes for factor of 12π in the formula for a volume of frustum of a cone encompassing a full tree using one base circumference, converting it to a volume formula that uses a basal circumference that is the average of circumferences C_{1} and C_{2.} By using separate factors for flare and taper and multiplying them together, we create a composite factor. It is suggested that these flare and taper could be extended in some cases to values in the range of 0.80 and 1.25 to allow extreme forms to be characterized by the formula. Similarly a model of overall trunk volume could potentially be predicted by using height, girth above basal flare, and the percent cylinder occupation for that species and age class. However, at this time there is insufficient data available to test this concept.

== See also ==
- da Vinci branching rule
