= Tree crown measurement =

Technique used in forestry

In forestry, a tree crown measurement is one of the tree measurements taken at the crown of a tree, which consists of the mass of foliage and branches growing outward from the trunk of the tree. The average crown spread is the average horizontal width of the crown, taken from dripline to dripline as one moves around the crown. The dripline is the outer boundary to the area located directly under the outer circumference of the tree branches. When the tree canopy gets wet, any excess water is shed to the ground along this dripline. Some listings will also list the maximum crown spread which represents the greatest width from dripline to dripline across the crown. Other crown measurements that are commonly taken include limb length, crown volume, and foliage density. Canopy mapping surveys the position and size of all of the limbs down to a certain size in the crown of the tree and is commonly used when measuring the overall wood volume of a tree.

Average crown spread is one of the parameters commonly measured as part of various champion tree programs and documentation efforts. Other commonly used parameters, outlined in tree measurement, include height, girth, and volume. Additional details on the methodology of tree height measurement, tree girth measurement, and tree volume measurement are presented in the links herein. American Forests, for example, uses a formula to calculate Big Tree Points as part of their Big Tree Program that awards a tree 1 point for each foot of height, 1 point for each inch of girth, and 1/4 point for each foot of crown spread. The tree whose point total is the highest for that species is crowned as the champion in their registry. The other parameter commonly measured, in addition to the species and location information, is wood volume. A general outline of tree measurements is provided in the article tree measurement, and more detailed instruction in taking these basic measurements is provided in "The Tree Measuring Guidelines of the Eastern Native Tree Society" by Will Blozan.

== Largest recorded crown spreads ==
Data on greatest crown spread is somewhat limited as this parameter is not measured as frequently as are tree height and trunk girth. The largest recorded is the "Monkira Monster" (Eucalyptus microtheca) located at the Neuragully Waterhole in southwestern Queensland, Australia, which measured 239 feet in 1954. A raintree (Albizia saman) in Venezuela was measured to have a crown spread of 207 feet in 1857. It reportedly is still living, but in poor health. A University of Connecticut site suggests that in the wild they may have crown spreads up to 80 meters. Robert Van Pelt measured a crown spread of 201 feet of a kapok tree (Ceiba pentandra) at Barro Colorado Island, Panama, in 2003.

== Crown spread methodologies ==
=== Cross-method ===
The average crown spread is the average of the lengths of longest spread from edge to edge across the crown and the longest spread perpendicular to the first cross-section through the central mass of the crown. Crown spread is taken independent of trunk position. Spread should be measured to the tips of the limbs, not to "notches" in the crown shape, and at approximately right angles from each other.

=== Average crown spread = (longest spread + longest cross-spread)/2 ===
The surveyor locates the point on the ground immediately below the branch tip on one end of the measurements and marks that position. He then moves to opposite side of the crown and locates the point under that branch tip. The spread along that line is the horizontal distance between those two positions. On steeply sloping ground (over 15 degrees) the taped distance between the two points can be corrected to a true horizontal by using basic trigonometry: horizontal distance = cos(inclination) × slope distance. The help of an assistant or the use of a laser rangefinder can greatly speed this process. When using a laser rangefinder, as in measuring tree height, several points on the far edge of the crown can be explored to find the furthest point. A laser rangefinder is also useful for measuring crown spread where one side of the crown is not easily accessible, such as a tree growing on a cliff side or other barrier.

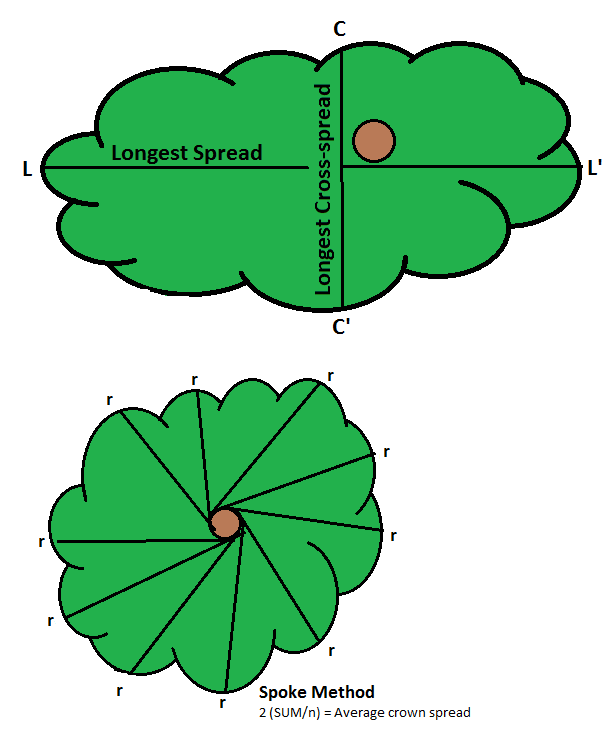
Tree crown spread measurement

=== Spoke method ===
When using the spoke method, four or more measurements are taken from the outer dripline of the crown to the side edge of the trunk. The distance to the side edge of the trunk is for all practical purposes equal in length to the distance to the center of the trunk. If the measurement from the dripline of the crown to the side edge of the trunk is not level, then the measured length must be converted to a horizontal distance.

spoke length = cos(inclination) × (measured distance)

If the slope angle is less than 10 degrees the difference between the horizontal distance and the measured length will be less than 1.5% for slope distances less than 100 feet. These individual spoke lengths are averaged and this average is equal to half the average crown spread. The more spokes measured in the process, the more accurate the characterization of the average crown spread.

$$2\times\frac{\text{sum}} n = \text{average crown spread}$$

This is the preferred method of canopy researchers and is probably the most accurate, and can also be used to quantify crown area. On large trees it can be accomplished quickly with a laser rangefinder.

Another instance where a laser rangefinder and clinometer are useful is if the canopy is high off the ground. For example, white pine typically has a long bare stem, with branching beginning far up the trunk. In these cases a series of shots taken to the outer reaches of the branches standing at the side of the trunk can be used to calculate the length of spokes. In this case the angles will be steep, and the length of a spoke will be:

cos(inclination) × (laser-measured distance) = spoke length

=== Google Earth measurements ===
With the increased availability of high-resolution air photos available through Google Earth crowns of individual trees can be distinguished, providing another option for measuring crown spread. Google Earth itself includes a ruler tool that can be used to measure diameters or spokes across the crown of the tree. Alternatively, the crown area can be measured and crown spread calculated from that value. EasyAcreage is a Google Earth area measurement tool that calculates the area of any shape outlined on the Google Earth display. The perimeter of the tree can be traced on a satellite photo, and the software will calculate the area.

Average crown spread can be determined with a simple formula:

$$\text{crown spread} = 2 \times \sqrt{\frac{\text{area}} \pi}$$

This area is the area of an equivalent circle. The measurement made through a remote sensing application may need to be checked in person.

Leverett has also provided four options for measuring the crown area through compass and clinometer surveys around the outer edge of the crown or through a combination of measurements from the edge of the crown and to the trunk, and those around the crown perimeter. All four circumscribe the crown area's drip-line with a polygon and divide the polygon into a series of adjacent triangles, measure the area of each triangle and sum them. One option, the Polygonal Method, measures each side of a triangle to compute its area. The second and third methods uses azimuths and one distance to the trunk calculate the area. The fourth method, the Azimuth Method, requires only azimuths and distance measurements from point to point around the crown perimeter.

=== Polygonal method ===
The measurer walks the perimeter of the crown following the drip line fairly closely. Points are identified on the ground that represent the outline of the crown and marked in a way so that the next point is always visible from the prior one. For the first point, the distance to the center of the tree's trunk is measured along with the vertical angle to the point. Then the distance to the next exterior point is measured along with the vertical angle. The measurer moves to that next exterior point and repeats the process, continuing clockwise until the crown is encircled. The last leg of the first triangle becomes the first leg of the second triangle, and so on, so only the first triangle requires measurements for all three legs. The result is a series of adjacent triangles with the sides determined. The area of each triangle is computed from its sides, and the sum of the areas computed. Each triangle covers part of the crown area. The sum of the triangles equals the total projected crown area. The instruments needed include a laser rangefinder or a tape measure and a clinometer.

=== Azimuth method ===
In the fourth method the measurer does not interact with the trunk or any internal point of the polygon. The measurer walks the perimeter shooting horizontal distances and azimuth to the next point until the crown's perimeter is circled. This is the simplest and most flexible method of the four. This method can also easily be used to measure the areas of other features encountered, for example, tree groupings or vernal ponds.

=== Maximum crown spread ===
This is another measurement that is sometimes collected. Maximum crown spread is the maximum width of the crown along any axis from the drip-line on one side of the tree to the dripline on the opposite side of the tree.

== Crown density ==
The USDA Forest Service has published a guidance document on field evaluations of a variety of crown characteristics beyond that of the normally taken basic measurements. Included are a series of definitions of terms, crown shape, crown density/foliage transparency, un-compacted live crown ratio, vigor class, and various dieback evaluations.

Crown density is the amount of crown branches, foliage and reproductive structures that blocks light visibility through the crown. Each tree species has a normal crown that varies with the site, genetics, tree damage, etc. It also serves as an indicator of expected growth in the near future. The crown density may be estimated using a Crown Density-Foliage Transparency Card. Using the card for reference the observer estimates what percentage of the light is being blocked by the crown mass. Estimates are made from two different directions at right angles and reconciled to determine crown density. There also are various electronic densitometers that will measure crown or foliage density.

== Crown volume estimates ==
Crown volume includes the entire living canopy of a tree from the base of the live crown to the upper edge of the crown and from the outer edge of the branch tips inward. It does not include dead branches, above or below the living portion of the canopy, nor any epicormic sprout below the base of the living crown. It does include hollows or voids encompassed within those boundaries. The crown volumes generally cannot be adequately represented by simple geometric shapes due their irregularity in form.

For extremely complex shapes the surface of the crown can be mapped in three dimensions from a series of external or internal survey stations. From each station the position of a point on the surface of the crown can be mapped using a compass, laser rangefinder, and clinometer. Measurements made include azimuth from the surveying location, distance from surveying position, distance to the point, and inclination to the point. These can be converted to (x, y, z) coordinates for each point, and the measurements between different surveying locations can be tied together by measuring the relative positions between the different surveying locations.

The distance to the target point:

cos(inclination) × lasered distance = (horizontal distance)

The position of the point relative to one's position using magnetic north is:

y-axis = (horizontal distance) × cos(azimuth)
x-axis = (horizontal distance) × sin(azimuth)

The height of the point relative to the measurement position is:

z-axis = sin(inclination) × laser-measured distance = height

Sufficient measurements must be made to generate a three-dimensional surface plot of the outer edge of the canopy. The volume can then be broken into smaller slices, the volume of each individual slice calculated, and the volume of all the slices added together to determine total volume canopy.

=== Live oak crown volumes ===
The crowns of most trees are too irregular in shape to be modeled by a simple geometric figure. The exception may be the shallow dome-like crowns of open grown live oak (Quercus virginiana) trees in southern and southeastern United States. A good description of the general form would be to liken it to the exposed portion of a hemisphere partially buried in the ground. A model was developed that can be used to determine the volume of tree canopies of this shape. A tree crown fits this shape model if:

a) it has a domed shaped top surface,
b) the base of the crown is flat or at ground level on a flat surface, and
c) the width of the crown spread is greater than or equal to twice the vertical thickness of the crown.

Many of the live oak trees do not have a perfectly round crown foot print. One axis of the tree will be broader than the perpendicular axis. If these values are relatively close, the two axes can simply be averaged to obtain an average crown spread. If they are widely different then the lengths of the axis can be converted to an equivalent circular radius for use in the crown volume calculation using this formula is:

$$\sqrt{\text{radius}_\text{minor axis} \times \text{radius}_\text{major axis}}$$

This correction is not large. An Excel spreadsheet was developed to implement the volume calculations.

Profile rotation method. The volume of the crown can be determined using three values:

1. crown spread,
2. crown thickness,
3. crown shape.

The thickness of the crown and the average crown spread will be measured and the general crown shape of the tree will be determined by visual comparison with a chart. The crown shape will be used to derive a crown form (CF) value for different tree shapes and will be the third parameter of the crown volume calculation formula. The crown of a tree can be subdivided into 10 disks each representing 1/10 of the height of the crown. The diameter of each disk can be expressed as some fraction of the average crown spread. Whether the tree is taller and each disk represents a greater length of the crown, or if the crown spread is larger or smaller, each disk will represent the same fraction of the total volume of the crown. Consider that there must be a single cylinder of the same height as the crown thickness that has the same volume as the irregularly shaped crown. The problem then becomes one of determining the diameter of this cylinder so that its volume equals that of the crown of the tree. The volume of each of the individual disks can be calculated by using the formula for the volume of a cylinder:

$$\text{volume of disk} = \pi \times \text{height}\times\text{radius}^2 = \pi\times \frac{\text{height}\times (\text{diameter}^2)} 4$$

By rearranging the numbers a formula can be derived for the radius needed for the single cylinder solution. The height and π drop out and the result is the needed radius equal to the square root of the average of the square of the radius for each of the disks.

$$\text{radius}_\text{cylinder} = \sqrt{\operatorname{average}(r^2)}$$

Tree shape profiles can be calculated individually for each tree encountered. However, examining the profiles of a large number of trees of different species found that typical profiles varied in a regular pattern, and for each profile family there was a Crown Form value that could be used to calculate the volume of the crown. Each different crown shape will have an associated crown shape ratio of the measured maximum average crown spread to radius of the equivalent cylinder diameter. This value cannot be used directly but first must be converted to a unique Crown Form factor value.

The formula for an equivalent cylinder may be expressed as follows:

$$\begin{align}
& \text{crown volume} = \text{volume of equivalent cylinder} = \pi h r^2 \\[5pt]
= {} & \pi \times \frac{(\text{thickness of crown}) \times \sqrt{\text{crown shape ratio}\times\text{average minimum crown spread}}} 4 \\[5pt]
& \text{where average minimum crown spread} = 2\times \text{average maximum radius}
\end{align}$$

The constants can be rearranged to derive a crown form (CF) factor:

$$\text{CF} = \frac{\pi\times(\text{crown shape ratio})^2} 4$$

The overall volume equation can then be rewritten as follows:

$$\text{crown volume} = (\text{CF})\times(\text{crown thickness}) \times \big( \text{average minimum crown spread})^2$$

Thus the complex problem of estimating crown volume is reduced to two easily measured parameters – average maximum crown spread and crown thickness, and one value that can be determined using visual matching of shapes from a table of standard shapes. Open areas contained within the rotation volume are considered part of the crown volume, while stray branch tips extending outside of the rotation volume are excluded. Some trees simply have a crown shape that is too irregular to use this methodology to determine crown volume. These trees, if a crown volume value is required, will need to be evaluated in sections and the volume of each section calculated individually.

== Limb length ==
The longest limb is measured from the collar where it emerges from a trunk to its farthest horizontal extent. It should also be noted if the limb is self-supporting or if it is touches the ground somewhere along its length. The length of the limb may also be measured along the contours of the limb itself. If easily accessible this can be accomplished by simply using a tape measure. If the limb cannot be reached then remote measurement methods need to be used. There are several viable measurement techniques that can provide us with useful information about limb extension.

=== Straight line length from beneath ===
The length of a limb can be measured with a laser rangefinder and clinometer if both end points of the limb are visible from a point beneath the end of the limb. The vertical distance is measured to the end of the limb directly over the measuring point at an angle of 90 degrees. The inclination and distance to the other end of the limb where it emerges from the trunk are then measured. The straight line length of the limb from trunk to tip can then be calculated using the Law of Cosines.

For long limbs with changing curvature determining the limb length into smaller segments with each segment measured independently will almost always be required if acceptable accuracy is to be achieved. The length can be calculated based on a bivariate curvilinear regression model using multiple measurement points. This holds promise provided a regression program is used that allows for both bivariate linear and nonlinear regression. A good statistical package that provides this capability is Minitab, which supports second and third degree equations. Regression models for parabolas and exponential curve forms have been developed by NTS in Excel spreadsheet format for the benefit of measurers who do not use statistical software. Of particular interest is the parabolic curve. A spreadsheet application of this for parabolic curves has been developed by NTS. The spreadsheet fits a parabola to 4 or more points (up to 10 allowed) using the least squares method and then calculates the limb length (s) using Simpson's Rule to evaluate the definite integral.

Limb Length via External Reference Position. Ground-based measurements can be used to measure the limb length and diameters of branch sections remotely through the use of a monocular w/reticle or photographic analysis. The length of a segment can be determined by measuring the position of the end points of the branch in 3-dimensional space from an external reference position. The length is then calculated by applying the Pythagorean theorem. The following diagram illustrates the process.

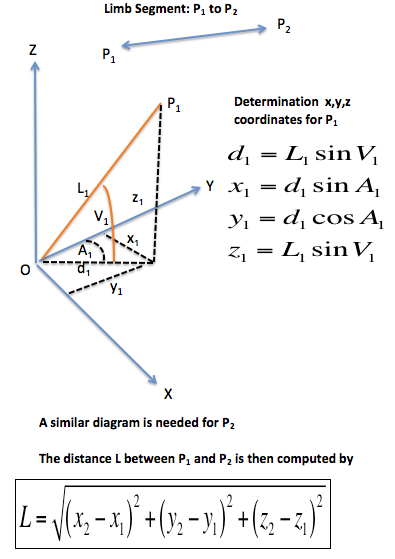
Three-dimensional coordinate calculations

From the external reference position O, the direct distance to L_{1} is measured to P_{1} along with the vertical angle V_{1} and azimuth A_{1}. The coordinates x_{1}, y_{1}, and z_{1} are then computed. The same process is followed for P_{2}.

This sequence is carried out as follows:

The horizontal distance d_{1} from the initial reference point O to a target point P_{1} is computed as d_{1} = cos(inclination) × laser distance = L_{1}sin V_{1} The value of x at the first point is: x_{1} = sin(azimuth) × horizontal distance = d_{1}sin A_{1} The value of y at the first point is: y_{1} = cos(azimuth) × horizontal distance = d_{1}cos A_{1} The value of z at the first point is: z_{1} = sin(inclination) × laser distance = L_{1}sin V_{1} This process is repeated for P_{2} to get (x_{2}, y_{2}, z_{2}) The final step is to compute the distance from P_{1} to P_{2} (L) using the following formula.

$$L = \sqrt{ (x_2-x_1)^2 + (y_2-y_1)^2 + (z_2-z_1)^2}$$

Note that we are squaring the changes in the x, y, and z values, adding these squares together and taking the square root of the sum.

Leverett has developed a methodology where the length of a limb is measured using a monocular w/reticle aligned along the orientation of the limb, the distance to either end of the limb segment, and a calculated scaling factor to determine limb length. Essentially the apparent length of the limb at each end as using the distance to that point and the scaling factor for that distance as if the limb were perpendicular to the observer. These lengths are considered to be the top and base of a regular trapezoid with a height equal to the difference in the distance between the two points. The true length of the limb can then be calculated by treating it as a diagonal of the trapezoid.

== Canopy mapping ==
Canopy mapping is the process whereby the positions and size of the branches within the canopy are mapped in three-dimensional space. It is a labor-intensive process that usually reserved for only the most significant specimens. This is usually done from a set position or a series of positions within the tree. Sketches and photographs are used to facilitate the process. Trees are climbed and the overall architecture is mapped including the location of the main stem and all reiterated trunks, in addition to all branches that originate from trunks. The position of every branch point in the canopy down to a certain size and also the positions of various reiterations, breaks, kinks, or any other eccentricities in the tree are also mapped. Each mapped trunk and branch is measured for basal diameter, length, azimuth, Climbers measure specific circumferences and detail other features within the tree.

== See also ==
- Agroforestry
- Crown closure
- Crown classes
- da Vinci branching rule
- Diameter at breast height
- Forest dynamics
- Forest farming
- Forest inventory
- Forest informatics
- Outline of forestry
