= Tree girth measurement =

Measurement of the circumference of a tree trunk

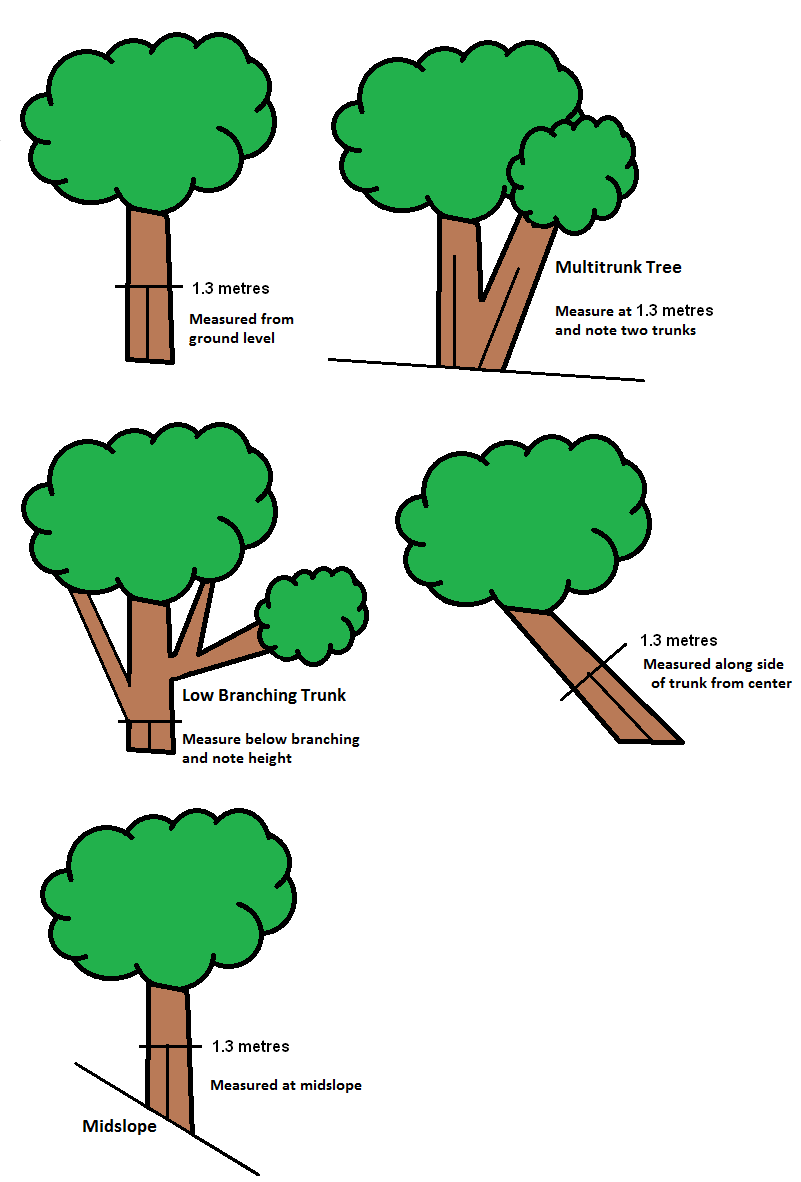
Tree girth measurement diagram

Tree girth is a measurement of the circumference of tree trunk. It is one of the most ancient, quickest, and simplest of foresters' measures of size and records of growth of living and standing trees. The methods and equipment have been standardized differently in different countries. A popular use of this measurement is to compare outstanding individual trees from different locations or of different species.

== Tree girth measurements ==
Girth is a measurement of the distance around the trunk of a tree measured perpendicular to the axis of the trunk. In the United States it is measured at breast height, or at 4.5 feet (1.4 m) above ground level. Elsewhere in the world it is measured at a height of 1.3 meters (4.3 ft), 1.35 meters (4.4 ft)1.4 meters (4.6 ft), or 1.5 meters (4.9 ft). The base of the tree is measured for both height and girth as being the elevation at which the pith of the tree intersects the ground surface beneath, or where the acorn sprouted. On a slope this is considered as halfway between the ground level at the upper and lower sides of the tree. This "breast height" value is a measurement grandfathered from decades of forestry applications. It was developed because of the simplicity and ease of measurement. There is no one ideal height at which to measure girth. Tree trunks flare outward at their base. In some trees this flare or buttressing extends only a short distance up the trunk, while in others it may extend thirty feet (9.1 m) or more up the tree, but the measurement is still taken at this default height for consistency. If the flare at the base of the tree extends above this default girth height, then ideally a second girth measurement should be collected where possible above the basal flare and this height noted.

Tree girth is one of the parameters commonly measured as part of various champion tree programs and documentation efforts. Other commonly used parameters, outlined in Tree measurement include height, crown spread, and volume. Additional details on the methodology of Tree height measurement, Tree crown measurement, and Tree volume measurement are presented in the links herein. American Forests, for example, uses a formula to calculate Big Tree Points as part of their Big Tree Program that awards a tree 1 point for each foot of height, 1 point for each inch of girth, and ¼ point for each foot of average crown spread. The tree whose point total is the highest for that species is crowned as the champion in their registry. The other parameter commonly measured, in addition to the species and location information, is wood volume. A general outline of tree measurements is provided in the article Tree Measurement Overview with more detailed instructions in taking these basic measurements is provided in "The Tree Measuring Guidelines of the Eastern Native Tree Society" by Will Blozan.

== Maximum girth records ==
The tree with the largest girth was the Glencoe Baobab (Adansonia digitata) in South Africa with a diameter near ground level of 52.2 feet (15.9 m), equivalent to a girth of 164 feet (50 m). In 2009 the hollow tree split into two parts. The Árbol del Tule in Santa Maria del Tule, Oaxaca, Mexico (Taxodium mucronatum) has a girth of 119.8 feet (36.5 m) and a height of 116.1 feet (35.4 m), with a 144-foot-wide (43.9 m) crown as measured by Dr. Robert Van Pelt in 2005. The Tule tree therefore has a diameter of 38.1 feet (11.61 m) as extrapolated from the tape wrap values. However, as the tree is heavily buttressed, and irregular in shape, a calculation of nominal diameter, defined as the cross-sectional wood area expressed as a circle, gives this tree a diameter at breast height of 30.8 feet (9.4 m)—a much smaller number, but a more accurate representation of the tree's size. Some have argued that the Tule tree is a multi-trunk tree consisting of three separate trunks emerging from the same root mass that have grown together to form the massive base of the tree and therefore its girth cannot be fairly compared to those trees with just a single trunk. Many of the large girth baobabs may be multi-trunk clusters as well. The General Grant Tree (Sequoiadendron giganteum) in Kings Canyon National Park in California is clearly a single trunk tree. It was measured to have a girth of 91.2 feet (27.80 m) measured at a height of 4.5 feet (1.37 m). There are historical accounts of trees with extremely large girths. These should not be just accepted at face value. In these older accounts the girths were often taken at ground level and incorporated considerable basal flare at the base of the tree. In other cases, the trees measured were multiple trunk masses or coppices treated as single trees in the girth measurements.

== Single-trunk versus multi-trunk trees ==
In many, but not all champion tree lists, and for data collected for scientific purposes, there is a need to distinguish between a single trunk tree and a multi-trunk tree. Two smaller trunks that grow together will achieve a large combined girth much faster than will a single trunk tree growing in the same conditions, so if the data will be biased if combined into a single dataset. A single trunk tree is defined as one that would only have a single pith if cut at ground level. A multi-trunk tree would have two or more piths at ground level. In this definition it does not matter if the trunks have grown together, nor if they are genetically the same and growing from a single root mass. If the tree has more than one pith at ground level, it is a multi-trunk tree. Separating data from single trunk and multi-trunk trees is critical to maintain a valid database of measurements. Data from both forms are worth collecting, but they should be considered different forms and the number of trunks included in the girth measurement should be listed for those trees with more than one trunk.

== Direct girth measurement procedures ==
The girth measurement is commonly taken by wrapping a Measuring tape (tape) around, and in the plane perpendicular to the axis of, the trunk, at the correct height. In spite of the apparent simplicity of wrapping a tape around a tree trunk at breast height, errors in this measurement are common. The most common error is mixing measurements of single trunk trees with those of multi-trunk trees and not distinguishing between the two. Even with single trunk trees irregular bumps and hollows are common. Some trees have low branches that split below breast height. Other trees have epicormic sprouts, suckers, or dead branches. Some tree trunks stand slanted at an angle rather than vertical. Girths of trees with these features may be measured by competing methods by different surveyors and result in differences. The basic guidelines for dealing with the above difficulties were developed by American Forests, and most of the guidelines used by other tree measuring groups around the world are based upon American Forests guidelines. The Native Tree Society measurement guidelines also generally follow the American Forests prescription, with some additional elaborations. Many trees have burls bumps, and knots along their trunk. If these occur at the 4.5 feet girth measurement height, including them in the measurement would falsely inflate the girth measurement. The girth measurement should then be taken at the narrowest point below the odd growth and the height of the girth measurement noted. In some cases a girth taken just above the odd growth will be more representative of the actual girth of the tree. In these cases the measurement should be taken there and the height above the base of the tree noted.

Some trees have branches at or lower than a height of 4.5 feet (1.37 m). Since the purpose of a girth measurement is to get a full measure of the tree's trunk, measurements should be taken at the narrowest point below any significant branching. When taking a girth measurement at a non-standard height the height of that measurement above the base of the tree should be noted. Epicormic sprouts, suckers, and dead branches can be ignored. Some guidelines have suggested that if a tree branches below breast height, that the girth of the largest branch should be measured at breast height ignoring the other branches. However, if a good portion of the trunk volume or cross-sectional area has been split from the total by measuring above a significant branching, then this is not giving a full and fair measure of the trunk's girth. If the pith of the branch does not intersect the pith of the main trunk above ground level, it is not a branch but a separate trunk and this tree should be considered a multi-trunk tree.

If the tree is leaning, measure the circumference at 4 1/2 feet (1.37 m) along the axis of the trunk. The distance should be measured along the side of the trunk from the base point of the center of the tree. The measurement is taken at a right (90 degree) angle to the trunk. Some groups recommend measuring the girth at breast height on the upper side when the tree is on a slope rather than from midpoint on the slope. One example is the Tree Register in the UK. There are advantages to either option. Measuring on the upslope side if often easier, it is also higher on the tree and likely will include less of the flare at the base of the trunk, and when measuring extremely large trunk on a slope the upslope side of the girth loop will always be above ground level. Measuring the girth from a reference point at midslope also has advantages. Consider, the tree started as a single sprout and grew upward and outward from that point. This is the point where the pith of the tree would intersect the ground surface supporting the tree. This is the logical base point from which to measure the height of the tree and by extension the girth should be measured with respect to the same base point. This point is fixed at the same location over time as the tree grows. In addition this is a reference point that is present and consistent in all trees no matter the height of the girth measurement. Even if the girth is measured at a non-standard height because of low branching, a large burl, or even on the upslope side of a large girth tree on sloping ground, all heights can still be consistently referenced to this single point present on all trees. Measuring midpoint on the slope is the recommended option.

Trees with very large girths, such as some of the sequoias growing the western United States, can also pose girth measurement problems. If they are growing on even a gentle slope, if girth is measured at 4.5 feet about where the pith of the tree emerges from the ground, the upside of the tape could easily be below ground level. In this case a better option would be to measure the standard girth measurement at 4.5 feet above ground level on the high side of the tree and note this in the measurement description [17] The height of this measurement point above the standard base point at midslope should also be noted. If measuring a mountaintop forest of stunted trees only six feet tall, a girth measurement made at 4.5 feet would be meaningless. In the case of these stunted trees a girth taken at 1-foot above the base might be more appropriate. The point is that the girth measurements should be taken at the standard heights whenever possible. Where this measurement is not meaningful, an additional girth measurement should be taken at a more appropriate position and that height noted. Converting the girth measurement to a diameter will always overstate the cross-sectional area of the trunk, therefore it is best to record the raw girth numbers directly rather than convert them to diameters. The conversion of girth values to approximate diameters can always be done later if needed for other types of analysis.

Measuring tree girth directly is a common educational technique allowing students to learn about their local environment in a practical manner. It is often used in the primary setting to introduce topics such as measuring, using numbers and simple calculation. Simple techniques can be used to estimate tree age.

== Remote girth measurements ==
Girth measurements may be taken remotely using photographic means or through the use of a telescopic reticle. In these cases the diameter as seen from the surveyor's position is actually measured and the girth is calculated by multiplying the diameter by π (pi).

A monocular w/reticle is a telescope with a built in scale that can be used to accurately measure the width of objects such as the diameters of trees from a distance. When sighting through the monocular the width of an object can be read as so many units of the scale. The farther away the object is from the surveyor, the smaller it will appear in the telescope and the width will read as fewer units on the scale. This change is constant with distance. The distance to the target can be measured with a laser rangefinder. The distance from the measured section of trunk multiplied by the reticle reading and divided by an optical factor results in the diameter of the target. For best results the scaling factor should be tested and calculated for each individual device rather than just using the manufacturer's default value. This process can be applied to volume measurements, as noted below, in addition to basic girth measurements. A variety of monocular w/reticles are available from different manufacturers. They can be used as hand held instruments but more accurate reading can be obtained when mounted on a tripod. Some higher end electronic surveying devices, like the Criterion RD 1000 have an electronic version of the reticle scale built into the device and can be used to measure diameters. Photographs of trees can be used to determine girth or other measurements if there is a something of known size in the photo to provide a scale. The following information must be known to approximate the measurements: 1) distance of the camera from the tree, 2) distance from the camera to the scale, and 3) size of the object to be used as a scale. An Excel spreadsheet can be used to determine the rate the apparent size of the scale changes with distance, and that value can be used to calculate the diameter of the tree given that the tree is circular in cross section and the distance to the front side of the tree is known. Girth then is calculated by multiplying the diameter by pi. The method may be used to calculate the girth of trees in historical photographs where the true dimensions are unknown. Assumptions would need to be made about the distances involved and the size of the people in the photograph, but reasonable estimates are possible. Preliminary tests are being conducted by the NTS to apply the photographic process to volume modeling of trees. A key consideration for many people is that only a minimal amount of equipment is needed to make these calculations: A laser rangefinder, a reference object (ruler), a digital camera, and Excel. A telescopic reticle is not needed. Photos from multiple angles are required to generate better data for the volume estimates. This process will be less accurate than measurements taken with a telescopic reticle, but will be able to generate meaningful close approximations of tree volume.

== Multi-trunk trees ==
Multi-trunk trees are the most common form after single trunk trees. Often these represent separate trunks growing from a single root mass. This occurs frequently in some species when the initial trunk has been damaged or broken and in its place two or more new shoots grow from the original root mass. These are genetically the same, but as their growth form is different they should be considered as a different measurement category than single trunk trees. These multiple trunks commonly will grow together to form a large combined mass at the base and split into individual trunks at greater heights. If they are individual trunks at breast height then the individual trunks can be measured separately and treated as individual single trunk trees. If they have grown together at breast height then a measurement of their combined girth should be made at that height the number of trunks incorporated into the girth measurement listed. If the tree splays outward dramatically at breast height, then the girth should be measured at the narrowest point between breast height and the ground and that height noted.

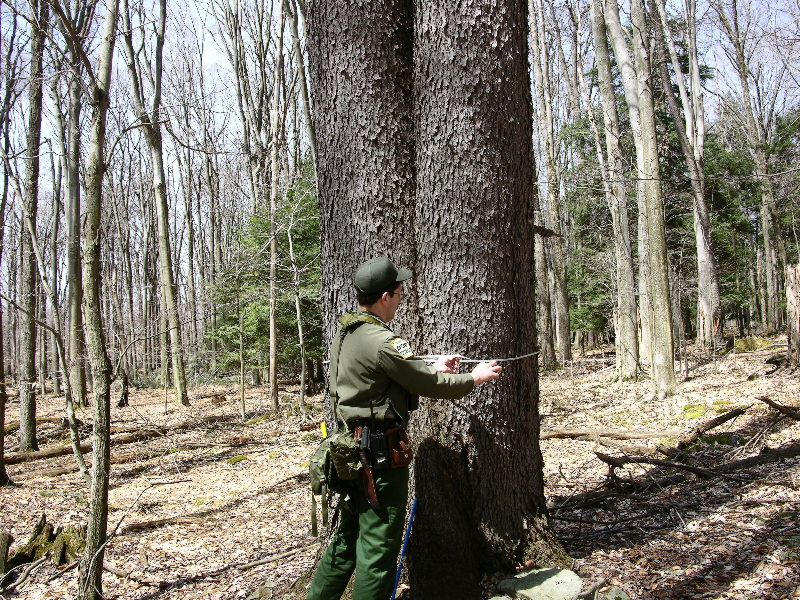
Double trunked Cherry Tree

Other girth measurements guidelines outlined for single trunk trees, such as low branches and burls, apply to multi-trunk girths as well. The height of the tallest trunk in the multi-trunk specimen would then be the height of the multi-trunk specimen and the combined crown spread of all the individual trunks the multi-trunk specimen collectively would be the multi-trunk crown spread. If one of the individual trunks is significantly larger than all the others, it can be treated as if it were a single trunk tree. Its girth is measured where it emerges from the combined mass, and the height and crown spread of that particular trunk is measured individually.

== Trees with unusual forms ==
Not all trees have a single trunk, and other single trunk trees pose additional measurement problems because of their size or configuration. The odd forms include those forms that grew because of unusual circumstances that affected the tree, or those trees that simply have an unusual growth form not seen in most other tree species. Frank proposed a classification system for various tree forms: 1) Single Trunk Trees; 2) Multi-trunk Trees; 3) Clonal Coppices; 4) Clonal Colonies; 5) Conjoined and Hugging Trees; 6) Fallen Trees; 7) Tree complexes, and 8) Banyan-like trees; 9) Trees with Large Aerial Root Systems; and 10) Epiphytic Trees. This initial framework has continued to evolve in discussions within the NTS, but provides an initial beginning and suggestions on how to approach measuring these various tree growth forms. Since most of these trees are unique or unusual in their form and not amenable to easy measurement, the recommended approach is to write a detailed narrative description of the tree with what measurements that can be taken to amplify and better illuminate the descriptions. These trees should be documented even if the results are in the form of a written narrative rather than a collection of numerical measurements. There are some parameters that should be consistently measured whenever possible, height is one example. The cross-sectional areas occupied by the trunks and the crown are also parameters that are generally measurable. Other measurements could be taken where they seem to add to the narrative description of that particular tree. GPS locations should be taken whenever possible. Absent a GPS instrument, the locations should be pulled from Google Maps, or topographic maps. Beyond these basics, values like number of trunks larger than a prescribed value, the maximum girth of the largest trunk, and whatever seems appropriate for that particular tree grouping should be recorded. Photographs of these unusual trees are important as they can immensely improve the understanding of what is being described, and help others to visualize the tree. A process or system is needed whereby the photos of a particular tree can be associated with the description of the tree in the researcher's notes. The goal of the narrative and measurements is to document the tree or tree grouping.

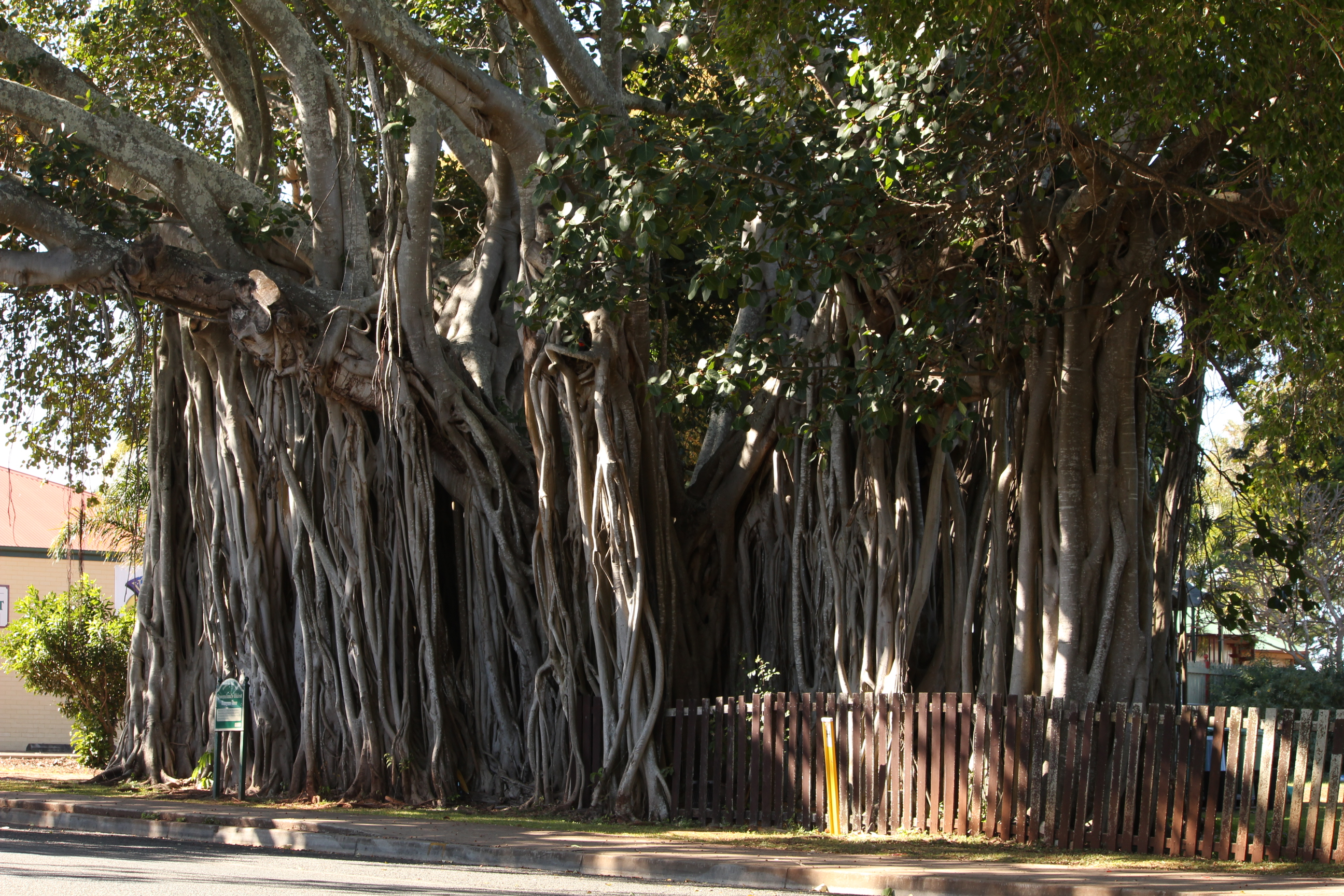
Banyan tree Cleveland

An approach needs to be developed that is appropriate for each of these unusual forms. For example, clonal colonies, such as the Pando aspen, may occupy many acres. The area occupied by the colony should be measured as well as the size of the largest individual trunk present. Banyan-like trees similarly consist of multiple trunks spread across a large area. In many of these specimens the interior trunks are not easily accessible, if accessible at all. An approach to their measurement would be to measure the area occupied by the many trunks, the area occupied by the crown of the tree, the height of the tree, and any other measurements the investigator deems appropriate. These measurements would then be supplemented by a narrative description and photographs. The goal in all of these cases of trees with unusual forms is to document their characteristics. Girth can also be thought of as essentially a snapshot of the cross-section of a tree at one particular elevation. In some cases the base of the tree may be so complex that simply wrapping a tape around the base would misrepresent the true wood girth or character of the tree. An example of this would be Big Tree of Tule in Santa María del Tule, Oaxaca, Mexico described above. The Tule tree has a diameter of 38 feet 1.4 inches (1,161.8 cm) as measured by tape wrap, but because of its irregularity a cross-sectional wood area expressed as a circle gave an effective diameter of only 30 feet 9 inches (937 cm). The base of the tree was mapped in three dimensions using a frame mapping technique. A rectangular frame was strung around the perimeter of the tree. A series of measurements from the reference lines to the edge of the trunk mapping the irregularities of the tree surface and converted to Cartesian x-y coordinates. The process was repeated at different heights to create a three-dimensional model of the tree. This mapping process can be automated. Taylor has been developing a cloud mapping process using optical parallax scanning technology whereby thousands of measurements are made around the trunk of a tree. These can be used to recreate a three-dimensional model of the trunk and girth and diameter data are among the values that can be calculated.

== Changes in girth values with age ==
For long term monitoring of girth, the exact point on the tree needs to be marked to assure the measurement is taken in the same place every session. Forestry data suggests that the slow down of diameter growth is correlated to a commensurate slow down in volume growth, but the association is not straightforward when whole tree mass is considered as opposed to the commercial part of the trunk. Diameter represents linear growth and volume is growth within a three-dimensional context. Slowdown in radial growth rates can occur without slowdown in corresponding cross-sectional area or volume growth. For example, research by Leverett has shown that even older white pine trees continue to add significant wood volumes, with 11 monitored trees on average adding 11.9 cubic feet (0.34 m^{3}) annually. By contrast, the (roughly) 300-year-old Ice Glen pine in Stockbridge, Massachusetts shows approximately half the annual growth rate of trees in the 90- to 180-year age range, averaging just 5.8 cubic feet (0.16 m^{3}) per year over a five-year monitoring period. Volume increased as a result of increases in both height and girth.

== See also ==
- Da Vinci branching rule
- Tree caliper
