= Tree measurement =

Forestry techniques

Members of the National Park Service measuring a tree

Trees have a wide variety of sizes and shapes and growth habits. Specimens may grow as individual trunks, multitrunk masses, coppices, clonal colonies, or even more exotic tree complexes. Most champion tree programs focus finding and measuring the largest single-trunk example of each species. There are three basic parameters commonly measured to characterize the size of a single trunk tree: tree height measurement, tree girth measurement, and tree crown measurement. Foresters also perform tree volume measurements.

Various groups involved in documenting big trees around the world use different methods. Other parameters also measured include trunk and branch volume, canopy structure, canopy volume, and overall tree shape. The appropriate measurement protocols for multi-trunk trees and other more exotic forms are less well-defined.

== Height ==
Tree height is the vertical distance between the base of the tree and the highest sprig at the top of the tree. The base of the tree is measured for both height and girth as being the elevation at which the pith of the tree intersects the ground surface beneath, or "where the acorn sprouted." On a slope this is considered as halfway between the ground level at the upper and lower sides of the tree. Tree height can be measured in a number of ways with varying degrees of accuracy. There are direct measurements. Shorter trees can be measured using a long pole extended vertically to the top of the tree. Larger trees can be climbed and a tape measurement made from the highest point of the climb to the base of the tree. The distance to the top of the tree can be measured from that point, if needed, using a pole. Historically the most direct method of finding a tree's height was to cut it down and measure it prostrate on the ground.

A stick measurement method. The height of the tree is equal to b×c/a.

Tree heights can also be measured remotely from the ground. The most basic remote height methodologies are all variations of the stick measurement. The height is calculated using the principle of similar triangles. A short stick is held out pointing vertically at arm's length by its base pointing vertically. The surveyor moves in and out toward a tree until the base of the stick above the lower hand aligns with the base of the tree and the top of the stick aligns with the top of the tree. The distance from the lower hand to the surveyor's eye is measured, the distance from the lower hand to the top of the stick is measured, and the distance from the eye to the base of the tree is measured with a tape. The ratio of distance from the eye to the hand is to the distance from eye to the base of the tree, as is equal to the ratio of the length of the stick to the height of the tree provided that the top of the tree is positioned vertically over the base.

(distance from eye to base of tree × length of stick) / distance from eye to base of stick = tree height

A second method uses a clinometer and a tape and is commonly employed in the forestry industry. This process applies the trigonometric tangent function. In this process the horizontal distance is measured to the trunk of a tree from a sighting position. The angle to the top of the tree is measured with the clinometer.

horizontal distance at eye level to the tree trunk x tangent Θ = height above eye level

If the tree extends below eye level the same process is used to determine the length below eye level and that is added to height above eye level to determine total tree height. Different clinometers have different reading scales, but all apply the same function. Calculations are as above if it reads in degrees. If it has a percentage scale, then the percentage is multiplied by the distance to the tree to determine a height or extension above and below eye level. Others have a 66' scale where if used at a distance of 66 feet from the tree the height above or below eye level can be directly read from the scale. Errors frequently accompany this type of measuring. The process assumes that the top of the tree is directly over the base of the tree. The tree top may be offset significantly from a point directly over the base (or level point on the trunk). Typical errors from this effect are often on the order of 10 to 20 feet. A bigger problem is misidentifying a forward leaning branch for the actual top of the tree. Errors associated with this mistake may yield measurements that are off many tens of feet and some errors of over forty feet and more have made it onto various champion tree lists, and in at least two cases, the errors have exceeded 60 feet.

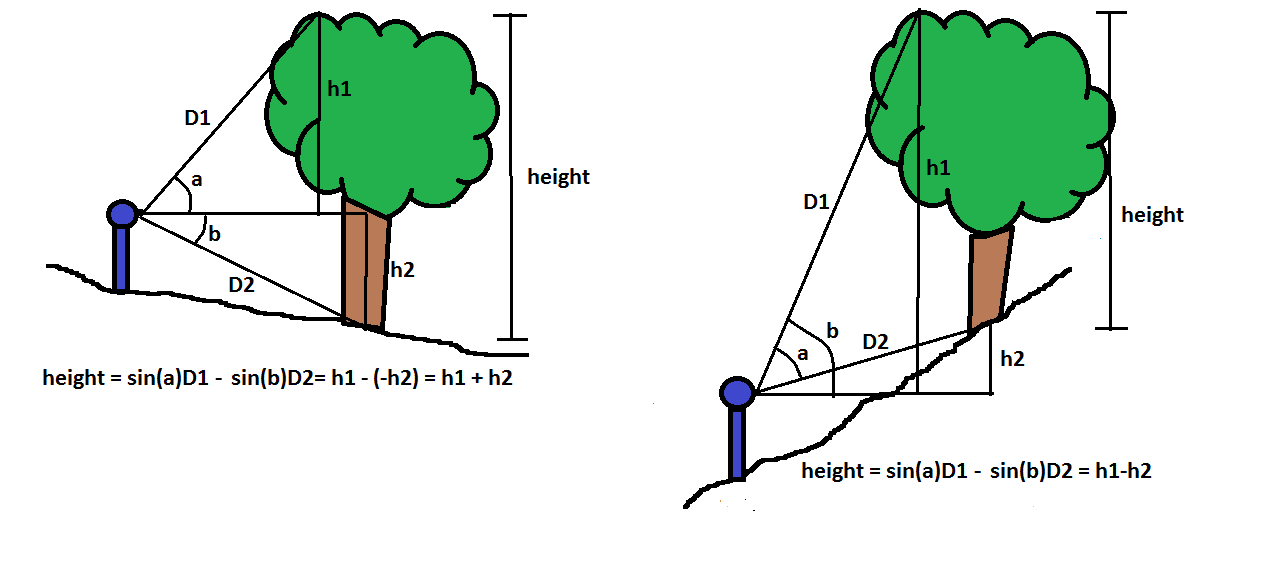
Sine height measurement

A third remote method is called the sine-height method or ENTS method. It requires the use of a laser rangefinder and clinometer. In this method the distance to the top of a tree is directly measured by the surveyor using the laser rangefinder. The angle to the top is measured with the clinometer. The height of the tree top above eye level: [height = sine Θ of angle x distance to the top] the same process is used to measure the extension of the base of the tree below or even above eye level. Since the measurement is along the hypotenuse of the right triangle and both the top and bottom triangles are independent, it doesn't matter if the tree top is offset from the base as this does not affect the calculation. In addition the top branches of the tree can be scanned with the laser rangefinder to find which top is actually the tallest and the major error of misidentifying the top can be avoided. If the true top of the tree is misidentified the height measurement for the tree will simply be short by some amount, and will not be exaggerated. The height will be correct for the target being measured. With calibration, multiple shots, and a technique to deal with scales that read only to the nearest yard or meter, tree heights can typically be measured to within one foot using this methodology. Other measurement techniques include surveying with a transit and a total station, extended baseline method, the parallax method, and the three verticals method.

== Girth ==
Girth is a measurement of the distance around the trunk of a tree measured perpendicular to the axis of the trunk. Use of girth to arrive at an equivalent diameter is an older forestry measurement that is still used. In the United States girth is measured at a height of 4.5 feet above ground level. Elsewhere in the world it is measured at a height of 1.3 meters, 1.4 meters, or 1.5 meters.

Tree girth measurement is commonly performed by wrapping a tape around the trunk at the correct height. Tree girth may also be measured remotely using a monocular with reticle, through photographic interpretation, or by some electronic surveying instruments. In these remote methods a diameter perpendicular to the surveyor is what is actually being measured and that is converted to girth by multiplying that number by pi. Many trees flare outward at their base. The standard height up the trunk for determining girth is easily measurable and in most trees it is above the majority of the basal flare and gives a fair approximation of the size of the trunk. For the largest trees, or those with a broad basal flare far up the trunk, it would be appropriate to also measure a second girth above the flare and to note this height.

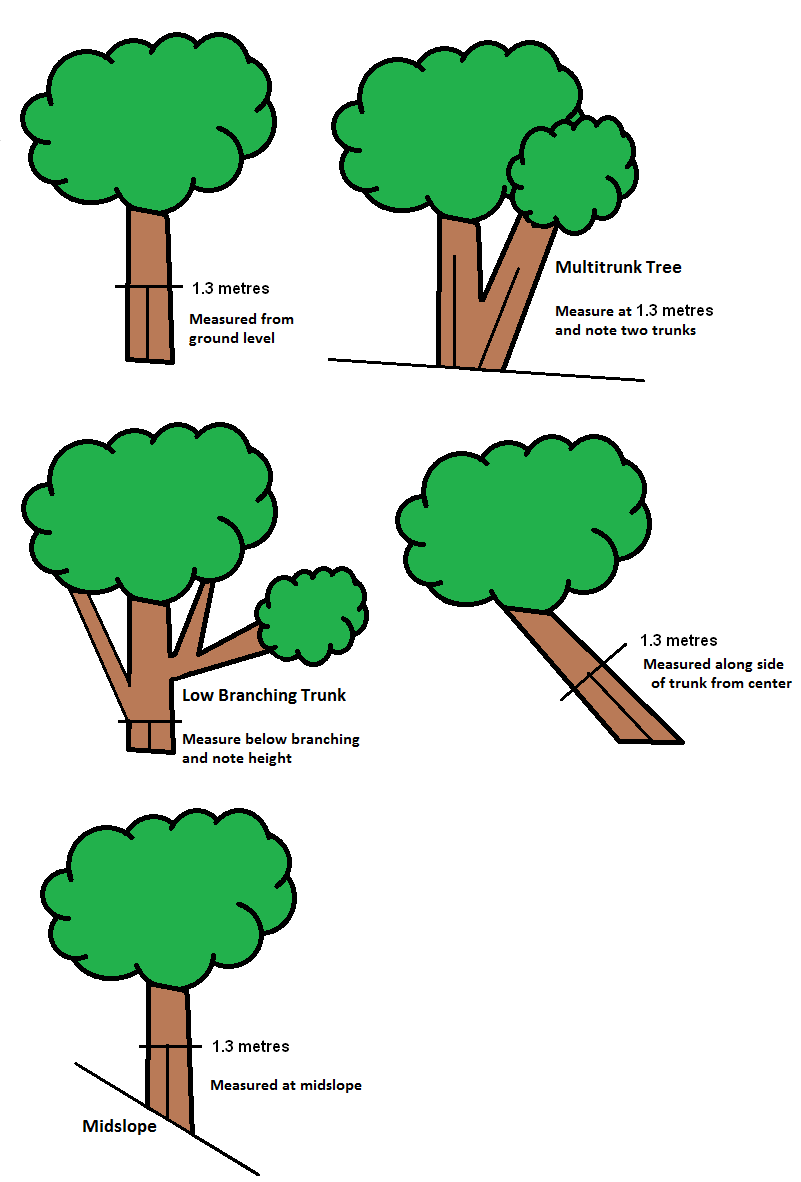
Tree girth measurement diagram

If there are significant low branches that emerge below this height, ignoring any minor epicormic sprouts and dead branches, then the girth should be measured at the narrowest point below the lowest branch and that height noted. If there is a burl or protuberance at the measurement height, then the girth should be measured immediately above the protuberance or at the narrowest point of the trunk below the protuberance and that height noted.

If the tree is growing on sloping ground the base of the tree should be considered to be where the center or pith of the tree intersects the supporting surface below, typically at mid-slope along the side of the tree. If the tree is large and this measurement would place one portion of the girth loop below ground level, then the measurement should be made at 4.5 feet above ground level at the high side of the slope.

It should always be noted whether or not the tree being measured is single or multitrunk. A single trunk tree is one which would only have a single pith at ground level. If the tree would have more than one pith at ground level, it should be listed as a multitrunk tree and the number of trunks included in the girth measurement noted. If the flare at the base of the tree extends above this default girth height, then ideally a second girth measurement should be collected where possible above the basal flare and this height noted.

== Crown spread ==
Crown spread is a measure of the footprint or plan area of the crown of the tree expressed as a diameter. The most basic crown spread measurement is the average length of two lines across the crown area. The first measurement is made along the longest axis of the crown from one edge to the opposite edge. A second measurement is taken perpendicular to the first line through the central mass of the crown. The two values are averaged to calculate crown spread. A second method is to take a series of four or more spokes running from the side of the center of the trunk to the edge of the crown. The more spokes measured the better the crown size is represented. The crown spread is twice the average of all of the spokes. For trees in open areas, crown spreads can also be measured from aerial imagery such as Google Earth. There are length measurements tools built into the program that will allow multiple diameters across the crown to be measured or averaged. Alternatively there are add-on software packages available that can allow an area to be outlined on the Google Earth image and the area enclosed calculated. This can then be converted to crown spread. has also provided four options for measuring the crown area through compass and clinometer surveys around the outer edge of the crown or through a combination of measurements from the edge of the crown and to the trunk, and those around the crown perimeter. Maximum crown spread and maximum limb length measurements can also be measured if needed.

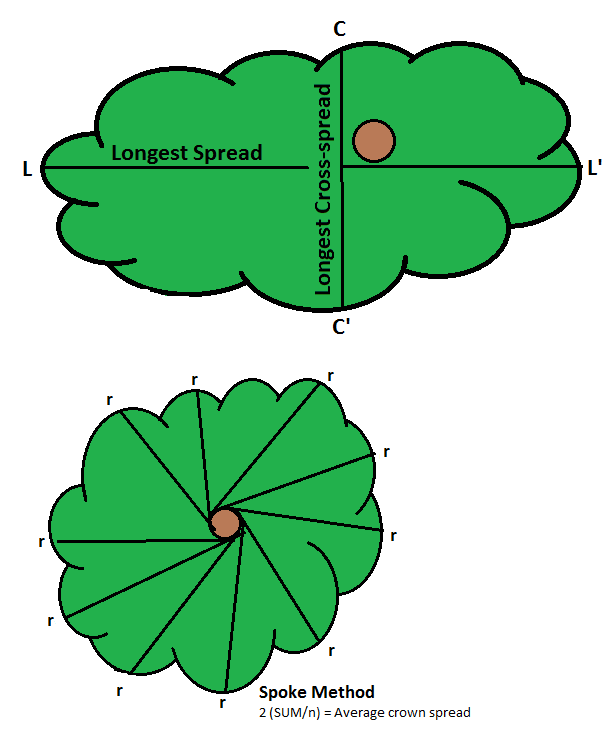
Tree crown spread measurement

Crown volumes can be measured as an extension of the basic crown spread measurement. One method is to map a network of points on the outer surface of the crown from various positions around the tree and plotted by map position and height. The crown itself can be subdivided into smaller segments and the volume of each segment calculated individually. For example, the crown could be subdivided into a series of disk-like slices by elevation, the volume of each disk calculated, and the total of all the disks are added together to determine crown volume. Frank developed a simpler method that requires measuring average crown spread, height of the crown from base to top, and matching the crown profile to best fit of a family of crown profile shapes. The method calculates the volume enclosed by rotating the selected profile around the axis of the tree given the measured crown length and average crown spread.

== Volume and canopy mapping ==
Tree volume measurements may include just the volume of the trunk, or may also include the volume of branches. Volume measurements can be achieved via ground-based or aerial methods. Ground-based measurements are obtained by the use of a monocular w/reticle, laser rangefinder, and a clinometer. Aerial measurements are direct tape measures obtained by a climber in the tree. A monocular w/reticle is a small telescope with an internal scale visible through the glass. The monocular is mounted on a tripod and the trunk of the tree is sighted through the lens. The width of the trunk is measured as so many units of the reticle scale. The height and distance of the target point is measured using the laser rangefinder and clinometer. With the distance known, the diameter of the tree measured expressed as units of the reticle scale, and an optical scaling factor for the monocular w/reticle, provided by the manufacturer and calibrated by the user, the diameter of the tree at that point can be calculated:

Diameter= (Reticle scale) X (distance to target) ÷ (optical factor)

A series of tree diameters up the trunk of the tree are systematically measured using this procedure from the base of the tree to the top and their height is noted. Some photographic methods are being developed to allow calculation of diameters of trunk and limb segments in photographs that contain a scale of known size and where distance to the target is known.

Tree climbers can physically measure the circumference of the tree using a tape. The climber will ascend into the tree until he reaches the highest safe climbing point. Once this point is reached a tape is pulled up along the side of the trunk via a drop rope. The upper end of the tape is lightly tacked at this point and allowed to hang freely down the trunk. The distance from the highest climb point and the top of the tree is measured using a pole that extends from the treetop to the anchor point of the tape. This height is noted and the diameter of the tree is measured at that point. The climber then rappels down the tree measuring the trunk circumference by tape wrap at different heights with the height of each measurement referenced to the fixed tape running down the trunk. Whether using the aerial or ground-based methods, the diameter or girth measurements do not need to be evenly spaced along the trunk of the tree, but a sufficient number of measurements need to be taken to adequately represent the changes in diameter of the trunk.

To calculate trunk volume, the tree is subdivided into a series of segments with the successive diameters being the bottom and top of each segment and its length equal to the difference in height between the lower and upper diameter. Cumulative trunk volume is calculated by adding the volume of the measured segments of the tree together. The volume of each segment is calculated as the volume of a frustum of a cone where:

Volume= h(π/3)(r_{1}^{2} + r_{2}^{2} +r_{1}r_{2})

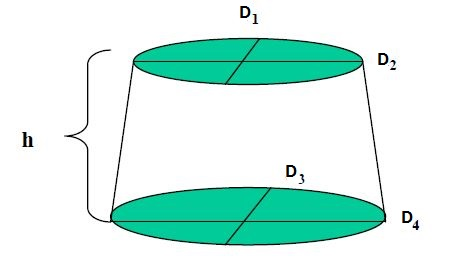
Frustum of a cone

A similar, but more complex formula can be used where the trunk is significantly more elliptical in shape where the lengths of the major and minor axis of the ellipse are measured at the top and bottom of each segment.

In areas where the trunk bifurcates the trunk will not have a circular or simple elliptical diameter. Blozan as part of the Tsuga Search Project created a wooden frame that would fit around the odd shaped section and measured the position of the surface of the trunk with respect to the frame. These points were plotted on a graph and the cross-sectional area of the irregular trunk shape was calculated. This area was, in turn, converted to an equivalent circular area for use in the volume formula.

Many trees flare outward significantly at the base and this basal wedge has a complex surface of bumps and hollows. This becomes an even more complex volume in trees growing on a slope. Approximations of the volume of this basal segment using best estimates of the effective diameters exhibited may be used in many cases. In other cases footprint mapping is an option. In footprint mapping a level, rectangular reference frame is placed around the base of the tree to create a horizontal plane. The position of the multiple points on the trunk surface is measured with respect to the frame and plotted. This process is repeated at different heights creating a series of virtual slices at different heights. The volume of each individual slice is then calculated and all are added together to determine the volume of the basal wedge. Taylor has been developing a cloud mapping process using optical parallax scanning technology whereby thousands of measurements are made around the trunk of a tree. These can be used to recreate a three-dimensional model of the trunk and volume data is among the values that can be calculated.

Canopy mapping is the process whereby the positions and size of the branches within the canopy are mapped in three-dimensional space. It is a labor-intensive process that is usually reserved for only the most significant specimens. This is usually done from a set position or a series of positions within the tree. Sketches and photographs are used to facilitate the process. Trees are climbed and the overall architecture is mapped including the location of the main stem and all reiterated trunks, in addition to all branches that originate from trunks. The position of every branch point in the canopy down to a certain size and also the positions of various reiterations, breaks, kinks, or any other eccentricities in the tree are also mapped. Each mapped trunk and branch is measured for basal diameter, length, and azimuth. Climbers measure specific circumferences and detail other features within the tree

== Trees with unusual forms ==
Not all trees have a single trunk, and others pose additional measurement problems because of their size or configuration. The odd forms include those forms that grew because of unusual circumstances that affected the tree, or those trees that simply have an unusual growth form not seen in most other tree species. Frank proposed a classification system for various tree forms: 1) Single Trunk Trees; 2) Multitrunk Trees; 3) Clonal Coppices; 4) Clonal Colonies; 5) Conjoined and Hugging Trees; 6) Fallen Trees; 7) Tree complexes, and 8) Banyan-like trees; 9) Trees with Large Aerial Root Systems; and 10) Epiphytic Trees. This initial framework has continued to evolve in discussions within the NTS, but provides an initial beginning and suggestions on how to approach measuring these various tree growth forms.

Since most of these trees are unique or unusual in their form and not amenable to easy measurement, the recommended approach is to write a detailed narrative description of the tree with what measurements that can be taken to amplify and better illuminate the descriptions. These trees should be documented even if the results are in the form of a written narrative rather than a collection of numerical measurements.

There are some parameters that should be consistently measured whenever possible, height is one example. The cross-sectional areas occupied by the trunks and the crown are also parameters that are generally measurable. Other measurements could be taken where they seem to add to the narrative description of that particular tree. GPS locations should be taken whenever possible. Absent a GPS instrument, the locations should be pulled from Google Maps, or topographic maps. Beyond these basics, values like number of trunks larger than a prescribed value, the maximum girth of the largest trunk, and whatever seems appropriate for that particular tree grouping should be recorded. Photographs of these unusual trees are important as they can immensely improve the understanding of what is being described, and help others to visualize the tree. A process or system is needed whereby the photos of a particular tree can be associated with the description of the tree in the researcher's notes. The goal of the narrative and measurements is to document the tree or tree grouping.

Single trunk trees can also pose measurement problems. Consider trees with very large girths, such as some of the sequoias growing the western United States. If they are growing on even a gentle slope, if girth is measured at 4.5 feet above where the pith of the tree emerges from the ground, the upside of the tape could easily be below ground level. In this case a better option would be to measure the standard girth measurement at 4.5 feet above ground level on the high side of the tree and note this in the measurement description. If measuring a mountaintop forest of stunted trees only six feet tall, a girth measurement made at 4.5 feet would be meaningless. In the case of these stunted trees a girth taken at 1 foot above the base might be more appropriate. Girth measurements should be taken at the standard heights whenever possible. Where this measurement is not meaningful, an additional girth measurement should be taken at a more appropriate position and that height noted.

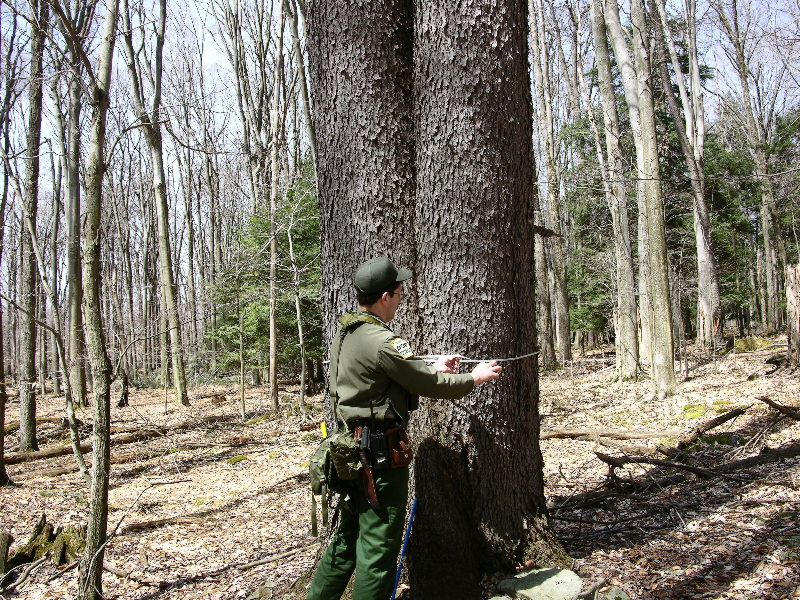
A double-trunked cherry tree

Multitrunk trees are the most common form after single trunk trees. Often these represent separate trunks growing from a single root mass. This occurs frequently in some species when the initial trunk has been damaged or broken and in its place two or more new shoots grow from the original root mass. These are genetically the same, but as their growth form is different they should be considered as a different measurement category than single trunk trees. These multiple trunks commonly will grow together to form a large combined mass at the base and split into individual trunk at greater heights. If they are individual trunks at breast height then the individual trunks can be measured separately and treated as individual single trunk trees. If they have grown together at breast height then a measurement of their combined girth should be made at that height the number of trunks incorporated into the girth measurement listed. If the tree splays outward dramatically at breast height, then the girth should be measured at the narrowest point between breast height and the ground and that height noted. Other girth measurements guidelines outlined for single trunk trees, such as low branches and burls, apply to multitrunk girths as well. The height of the tallest trunk in the multitrunk specimen would then be the height of the multitrunk specimen and the combined crown spread of all the individual trunks the multitrunk specimen collectively would be the multitrunk crown spread. If one of the individual trunks is significantly larger than all the others, it can be treated as if it were a single trunk tree. Its girth is measured where it emerges from the combined mass, and the height and crown spread of that particular trunk is measured individually.

Clonal colonies, such as the Pando aspen, may occupy many acres. The area occupied by the colony should be measured as well as the size of the largest individual trunk present.

Banyan-like trees similarly consist of multiple trunks spread across a large area. In many of these specimens the interior trunks are not easily accessible. An approach to their measurement would be to measure the area occupied by the many trunks, the area occupied by the crown of the tree, the height of the tree, and any other measurements the investigator deems appropriate. These measurements would then be supplemented by a narrative description and photographs. The goal in all of these cases of trees with unusual forms is to document their characteristics.

== Tree shape ==
Different tree species tend to have different shapes and tree shapes also vary within a single tree species. As a general observation trees growing in an open setting tend to be shorter and have broader crowns, while those growing in a forested setting tend to be taller and have narrower crowns. In forested areas trees grow taller and put more energy into height growth as they compete with other trees for the available light. Often the tallest examples of many species are found where they are a secondary species on a site and competing for light with other taller tree species. The tall bay laurel (Umbellularia californica) at 169.4 feet discovered by Zane Moore in Henry Cowell Redwoods State Park is an example of an exceptionally tall understory tree growing among other taller species.

Ternary Tree Shape Plots. A methodology for plotting different tree shapes graphically was developed by Frank using ternary plot diagrams. Ternary plots can be used to graphically display any set of data that includes three terms which total to some constant. Generally this constant is 1 or 100%. This is ideal for plotting the three most commonly measured tree dimensions. The first step in the analysis is to determine what an average shape for trees is in general. These three basic parameters can be expressed as a ratio of height to girth to average crown spread. Some trees are tall and narrow, while others are low and broadly spreading. The data used to determine the average tree shape is derived from a tabulation of the largest trees of each of 192 different species in the NTS 2009 dataset. The average girth, height, and crown spread values were calculated for the measurements included in the listing. For the dataset the average height was 87.6 feet, the average girth was 100.1 inches, and the average spread was 54.9 feet. It is not critical that these values be exact for analysis purposes. The next step is to standardize each measured parameter. The quantity measured for a particular tree is divided by the standard value as determined above. The next step is to normalize the data set so that the sum of the three parameters expressed as a percentage will equal one. This enables the shapes of different trees of different sizes to be compared. The final step is to plot these results as a ternary graph to better compare the results. As an example, the measurement data for 140 live oaks measured as part of the NTS Live Oak Project were graphically plotted using this process.

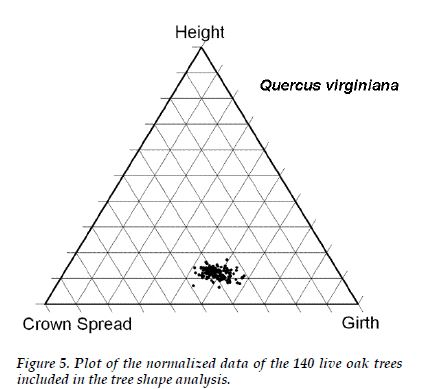
Tree shape diagram for live oak

The cluster representing the live oak data falls on the extreme edge of the general pattern of tree shapes. The height proportion exhibits a maximum of 17.23% of the shape value and a minimum of 6.55%, the girth (minimum of 19 feet in the data set) exhibits a maximum of 58.25% and a minimum of 40.25%, and Average Crown Spread maximum of 49.08% and a minimum of 30.92%. These points represent the measurements of the largest specimens of live oak measured in the field and typically represent open grown specimens, but the tightness of the shape cluster is still remarkable. It is even more interesting to note that while the data set contains both multiple trunk trees and single trunk trees, both plot within the same tight cluster.

== Dendrochronology ==
Dendrochronology is the science of dating and study of annual rings in trees. A tree in temperate and colder climates typically will grow one new ring every year, therefore the age of the tree can theoretically be determined by counting the number of rings present. The problem lies in the fact that some years, particularly in years of drought, a tree will not grow an annual ring. In other years where the growing season is interrupted a tree may grow a second false ring. The trees rings are commonly measured by taking a series of core samples. A borer is used to extract a pencil-size diameter or smaller core from a living tree or from a log. For downed and dead trees a disk section or "tree cookie" may also be taken, these are polished, the rings identified, and the number of rings and the distance between each are recorded. By comparing rings from multiple trees, through cross-dating, a dendrochronologists can determine if rings are missing or if false rings are present. Through this process the tree ring record can be used to investigate past climatic conditions. Tropical trees often lack annual rings and ages for these trees can be measured using radiocarbon dating of wood samples from the trees.

There are two major listings of the maximum ages of trees. The OldList is a database of ancient trees maintained by Rocky Mountain Tree-Ring research. Its purpose is to identify maximum ages that different species in different localities can attain such that exceptionally old age individuals may be recognized. In addition to the original OldList, Neil Pederson at the Tree Ring Laboratory of Lamont–Doherty Earth Observatory and Columbia University has created an eastern OLDLIST focused on old trees in the eastern North America. In addition to these sources of tree ring data there is the ITRDB. The International Tree-Ring Data Bank is maintained by the NOAA Paleoclimatology Program and World Data Center for Paleoclimatology. The Data Bank includes raw ring width or wood density measurements, and site chronologies. Reconstructed climate parameters, including North American Drought, are also available for some areas. Over 2000 sites on six continents are included.

The oldest known tree is a Great Basin bristlecone pine, Pinus longaeva, growing in the White Mountains of eastern California. The tree was cored by Edmund Schulman in the late 1950s, but was never dated. Recently Tom Harlan completed the dating of the old core sample. The tree is still alive and is 5062 years old as of the 2012 growing season. Older ages are given for sprouts growing from roots or clonal colonies, but these values are not from an individual stem that has persisted for that duration. Whether these are considered to be older trees or not is dependent on the definition of the term 'tree'.

In spite of the extensive amounts of work done by dendrochronologists in investigating trees, the maximum ages attainable by most common species is not clear. Dendrochronologists typically focus on trees that are known to have a long life span when investigating a site. This is because their goal is paleoclimatic reconstruction or archaeological investigation and longer lived trees provide longer data record. Most species believed to be shorter lived have not been systematically investigated and cross dated. The Native Tree Society is compiling basic ring counts for many of these species in order to better understand the age structure of the forests they are investigating, with the recognition that ring counts ages may be off due to missing or false rings.

== Big tree formulas ==
American Forest Formula. American Forests has developed a formula for calculation tree points for determining champion trees for each species. Three measurements: Trunk Circumference (inches), Height (feet), and Average Crown Spread (feet). Trees of the same species are compared using the following calculation:

Trunk Circumference (inches) + Height (feet) + ¼ Average Crown Spread (feet) = Total Points.

The American Forests National Big Tree Program is the largest in the world with coordinators in all fifty states and the District of Columbia and is used as a model for several Big Tree programs around the world. American Forests describe it as a conservation movement to locate, appreciate and protect the biggest tree species in the United States with more than 780 champions crowned each year, with 200 more species without a crowned champion in 2012, and documented in their biannual publication — the National Register of Big Trees. The program has been operating since 1940.

For example, the Australian National Register of Big Trees uses the American Forests formula. The individual measurements are listed using both Imperial and metric values. Trees must be single-stemmed at 1.4m above ground where circumference is measured. They write that making the Australian tree Points directly comparable to the U.S.A. is important because Australians can view the American Forests Register of Big Trees and gain immediate, and much enjoyment, in comparing their Champions with ours, and vice versa for North American tree enthusiasts viewing our NRBT.

Tree Dimension Index. The Native Tree Society, in addition to the American Forests formula, uses an alternative approach to compare relative sizes of trees, both within the same species and against others. The Tree Dimension Index (TDI) is highly adaptable and can be tailored to reflect the attributes of an individual tree and how they compare relative to the largest known specimen. The premise is that the specific dimensions of the tree are given a value (percentage) that reflects its relative rank against the maximum known for the same dimension for the species. For example, the tallest known eastern hemlock would get a value of 100 for height since it represents 100% of the maximum value known for the species. A shorter tree that was 75% of the maximum known height would get a value of 75 for its height. Likewise, the values of diameter and volume would be determined by the relative value when ranked against the known maxima. With three ranked attributes the maximum TDI value would theoretically be 300. However, this would represent one tree exhibiting all three maxima- an unlikely possibility. However, the apparent size of a tree can be realized by ranking the cumulative values against the theoretical maximum. A tree scaling close to 300 would suggest that it was nearly the largest specimen theoretically possible based on currently known maxima. A two-value TDI using height and girth was presented for 259 white pines (Pinus strobus) by Friends of Mohawk Trail State Forest to MA DCNR in 2006. The TDI values in the dataset ranged from 172.1 to 125.2 out of a possible maximum of 200.

== Tree value approximation (USA) ==
Studies have shown that trees contribute as much as 27% of the appraised land value in certain markets and cite the following table which can be extrapolated with care.

Basic tree values (varies by region)
diameter (inches)	value (1985 US$)
10	$1,729
14	$3,388
18	$5,588
26	$11,682
30	$15,554

These most likely use diameter measured at breast height, 4.5 feet (140 cm) above ground, not the larger base diameter. A general model for any year and diameter is

Value = 17.27939*(diameter^2)*1.0279^(year-1985) ...assuming 2.79% inflation per year.

The right side of this equation is written to paste into Excel or Google to perform the calculation. Extrapolations from any model can vary widely, so value estimates for diameters larger than 30 inches (760 mm) may have to be capped so trees do not exceed 27% of total appraised land value.

== Location ==
As with any other scientific investigation it is critical to establish the location of the trees being investigated. Without that information, the location of tree may be lost and other investigators will not be able to relocate the tree in the future. There is also the possibility that the same tree might be misidentified and re-measured as a different tree. GPS locations should be taken for every tree measured. GPS in most cases is accurate enough to distinguish the location of a specific tree. The actual accuracy users attain depends on a number of factors, including atmospheric effects and receiver quality. Real-world data collected by the FAA show that some high-quality GPS SPS receivers currently provide better than 3 meter horizontal accuracy. If GPs is not available then the approximate latitude and longitude data should be topographic maps, or air photo sources such as Bing Maps, Google Earth, or similar services.

== Tree databases ==
Several of the larger tree groups maintain interactive databases of tree information. Different types of information are available on different databases and there are different requirements for data entry. American Forests provides a searchable database of their Champion trees and in 2012 included data on 780 tree species. Most of the individual state big programs are administrated through the American Forest Big Tree Programs. The Native Tree Society has its own database Trees Database with the requirement that the trees entered meet their height measurement standards. There also are databases maintained by Australia's National Register of Big Trees, The New Zealand Tree Register, Monumental Trees (primarily focused on Europe but including trees from elsewhere in the world), and The Tree Register - A unique record of Notable and Ancient Trees in Britain and Ireland.

There are many other sites maintained by groups and individuals that include tabulations of big trees of a specific area, of a particular species, or simply the largest individuals. Some of these include Landmark Trees, Native Tree Society, Old Trees in The Netherlands and Western Europe, the big eucalypts of Tasmania and Victoria, and the Old Growth Forest Network.

In all cases, the data collected needs to be organized into a useful searchable format that can be used. The Native Tree Society provides a free downloadable excel spreadsheet that can be used for organizing tree datasets Tree Measurement Data Spreadsheet. The spreadsheet can be modified for the needs of the user.

== Rucker Indexes ==
Rucker Index is a family of indexes that are used to compare tree population between different tree sites. It is not species-dependent and can be applied to sites of different sizes. The basic Rucker Index is a measure of overall tree height. The Rucker Height Index 10 or RI10 is the numerical average of the height in feet of the tallest individual of each of the ten tallest species on a site. A particular species enters the index only once. The index provides a numerical evaluation of both maximum height and diversity of the dominant species. High index values are the result of many factors, including climate, topography, soils, and a lack of disturbance. While the most extensive sites benefit from a greater variety of habitat and more individual trees, some exceptional sites are quite small. The Rucker Height Index is essentially a foreshortened version of a complete profile of all the species found on a particular site.

Variations of the Rucker Index can also be calculated. If the site has a high diversity of species a RI20 can be calculated using twenty species. For sites with limited data or low species diversity, a RI5 with only five species can be calculated. A Rucker Girth Index or RGI10 can also be calculated using the girth of the largest girth individual in each of the ten fattest species on a site.

The Rucker Height Index or Rucker Index has numerous merits that make it a useful measurement when comparing various tall tree sites:

1. The formula is straight forward, unambiguous, and easy to apply;
2. The index can be applied to forests in any area with any make-up of trees;
3. The index requires a fairly diverse mix of trees in order to generate a high index value; and
4. To get a sufficient diversity of trees of great height requires at least a modest size or larger plot of forest and a reasonably thorough examination to generate a high RI value.

In January 2012 the calculated Rucker Index for the World was 312.39 feet. The Rucker Index for the west coast of North America, and also all of North America is 297 The RI10 for Great Smoky Mountains National Park is 169.24, the tallest site in eastern United States. For the northeastern United States, the RI10 is 152.6, and for the southeast, excluding GSMNP the RI10 is 166.9.

== See also ==
- da Vinci branching rule
- Forest inventory
