= List of superlative trees =

Tallest, largest, stoutest, widest, and other such trees

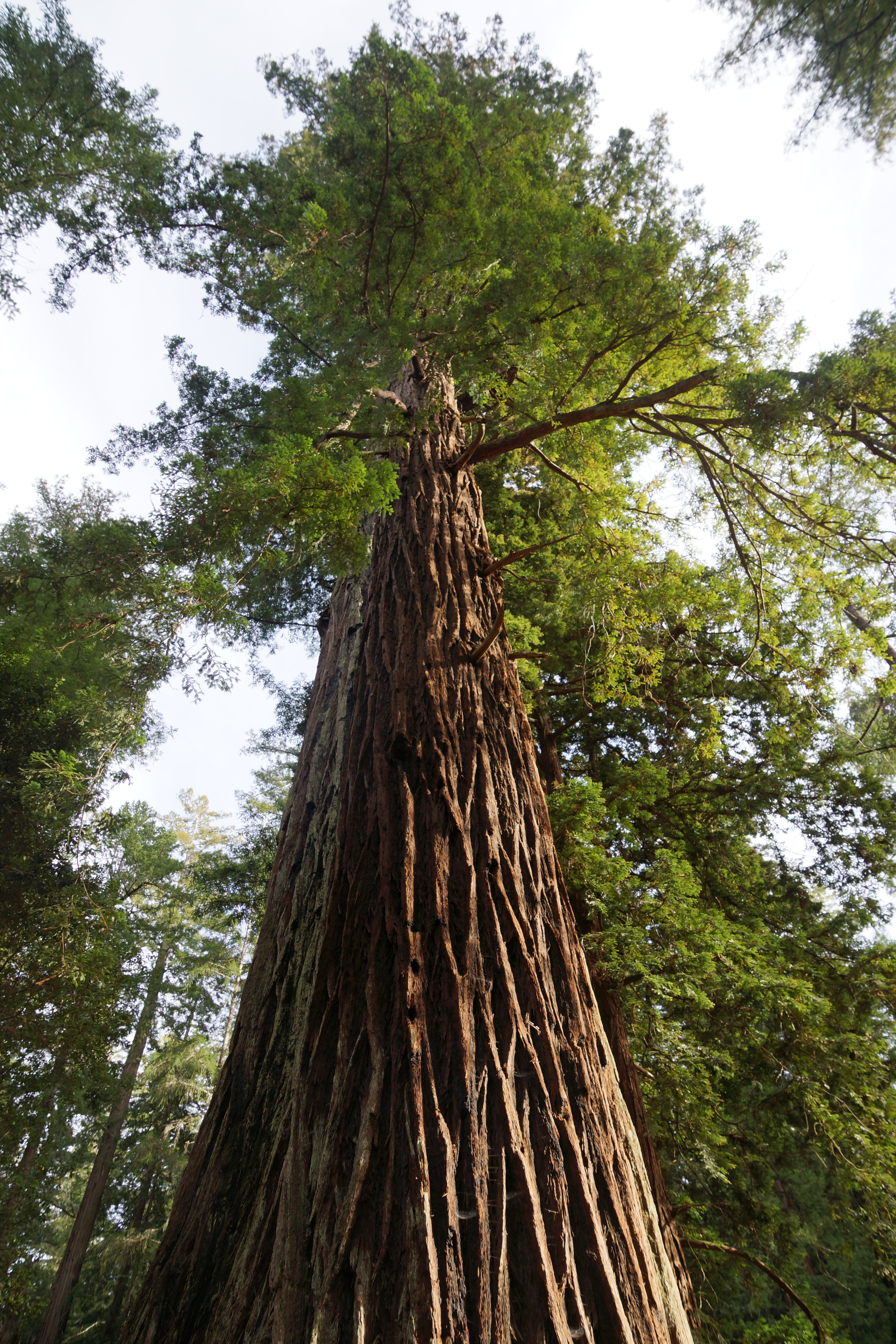
The coniferous Coast redwood (Sequoia sempervirens) is the tallest tree species on Earth.

The world's superlative trees can be ranked by many factors. Records have been kept for trees with superlative height, trunk diameter (girth), canopy coverage, airspace volume, wood volume, estimated mass, and age.

== Tallest ==
The heights of the tallest trees in the world have been the subject of considerable dispute and much exaggeration. Modern verified measurements with laser rangefinders or with tape drop measurements made by tree climbers (such as those carried out by canopy researchers), have shown that some older tree height measurement methods are often unreliable, sometimes producing exaggerations of 5% to 15% or more above the real height. Historical claims of trees growing to 130 m (430 ft), and even 150 m (490 ft), are now largely disregarded as unreliable, and attributed to human error.

The following are the tallest reliably measured specimens from the top 10 species. This table shows only currently standing specimens:

List of tallest living trees by species
Tree name	Species	Height		Country	Location	References and notes
Tree name	Species	Meters	Feet	Country	Location	References and notes
Hyperion	Coast redwood (Sequoia sempervirens)	116.22	381.3	United States	Redwood National Park, California	It reached 116.22 metres (381.3 ft) in 2026; second and third tallest when Hyperion was found, were Helios 114.7 metres (376 ft) and Icarus 113.1 metres (371 ft) tall (in 2006).
	South Tibetan cypress (Cupressus austrotibetica)	102.3	336	China	Yarlung Zangbo National Nature Reserve, Tibet	
	Sitka spruce (Picea sitchensis)	100.2	329	United States	Redwood National Park, California	
	Coast Douglas-fir (Pseudotsuga menziesii var. menziesii)	99.8	327.5	United States	Near Eugene, Oregon	"Douglas Fir: The "holy grail" is a 327.5-foot specimen, near Eugene, Oregon. A tree in Redwood National Park that stands 326-feet is currently the closest contender. Another giant doug fir, over 330-feet grew in Hand Creek Oregon but recently lost its top."
Menara	Yellow meranti (Shorea faguetiana)	97.58	320.1	Malaysia	Danum Valley Conservation Area, Sabah	The original quoted figure of 100.8m was from the top leaves to the bottom of the buttresses on the low side of ground. The correct height of the tree is 97.58m – that is the average between the distance to the lowest part of bole and the distance to the highest part of bole
	Giant sequoia (Sequoiadendron giganteum)	96.37	316.2	United States	Sequoia National Park, California	
Centurion	Mountain ash (Eucalyptus regnans)	96	315	Australia	Arve Valley, Tasmania	Tree had reached 100.5 m in 2018, but lost 4 meters of height by 2025 due to the 2019 fire damage and now ranks 7th as tallest living tree species.
Neeminah Loggerale Meena, or Mother and Daughter	Southern blue gum (Eucalyptus globulus)	90.7	298	Australia	Evercreech Forest Reserve, Tasmania	The crown of this tree is dying back.
	Dinizia excelsa	88.5	290	Brazil	Near the boundary of Amapá and Pará	

== Tallest historically ==
Despite the tall heights attained by trees in the present, records exist of much greater heights in the past, before widespread logging took place. Some, if not most, of these records are likely greatly exaggerated, but some have been reportedly measured with semi-reliable instruments such as tape lines, tape measures or chains, when cut down and measured on the ground by forestry officials, licensed surveyors or reputable lumbermen. Some of the heights recorded in this way exceed the maximum possible height of a tree as calculated by theorists, lending some limited credibility to speculation that some superlative trees are able to 'reverse' transpiration streams and absorb water through needles in foggy environments.

List of tallest historically known non-surviving or lost trees
Tree name	Species	Height		Country	Location	References and notes
Tree name	Species	Meters	Feet	Country	Location	References and notes
G Klein Tree	Mountain ash (Eucalyptus regnans)	147.218	483.00	Australia	At the Black Spur, Victoria	Note: Fallen in 1865 and measured by Mr. Gustav Klein at 483 feet in length, and 10 feet diameter 16 feet above ground.
Nooksack Giant	Douglas-fir (Pseudotsuga menziesii)	141.732	465.00	United States	Alpenglow Farm, Washington	Note: Cut down in 1897. Measured using a tape by lumbermen
Father of the Forest	Giant Sequoia (Sequoiadendron giganteum)	137.16	450	United States	Calaveras Grove, California	Highest estimate, lowest is 365 ft; fell several centuries ago
Ferguson Tree	Mountain ash (Eucalyptus regnans)	132.588	435.00	Australia	Near the Watts River, Victoria	Note: Fallen in 1872, and measured on the ground by a Government Forester with a tape line. Reportedly missing part of the top
Eel River Giant	Coast redwood (Sequoia sempervirens)	130.15	427.0	United States	Englewood, Redcrest California	Note: Cut down on Feb 14, 1893, and measured on the ground by lumbermen
Nehalem Giant	Douglas-fir (Pseudotsuga menziesii)	129.54	425.0	United States	Nehalem River, near Jewell, Oregon	Note: Cut down in February 1886 and reportedly measured on the ground by property owner at 405 feet in length from "butt to uppermost bough." Later vouched for in 1931 by a local witness who recalled it measured 425 feet from "roots to uppermost bough." It retained a 14 feet diameter over 100 ft high.
Lynn Valley Tree	Douglas-fir (Pseudotsuga menziesii)	126.5	415	Canada	Lynn Valley, British Columbia	Note: Cut down in 1902 and measured on the ground by property owner.
Yarragon Tree	Mountain ash (Eucalyptus regnans)	124.968	410.00	Australia	South Yarragon Ranges, Victoria	Note: Felled c. 1889 and measured on the ground by a settler of the district at 410 feet in length. Reportedly part of tree was burnt off.
Mineral Tree	Douglas-fir (Pseudotsuga menziesii)	119.786	393.00	United States	Mineral, Washington	Note: Progressively lost height until falling in a storm in 1930. Standing portion and fallen top measured by lumbermen, a civil engineer, and at least one Govt. Forester between years 1905 and 1930. One of the oldest Douglas fir on record at 1,020 years in age
Eureka Tree	Coast redwood (Sequoia sempervirens)	115.824	380.00	United States	Eureka, California	Note: Standing height surveyed, and tree then cut down in 1914 and measured by lumbermen.
Nisqually Tree	Douglas-fir (Pseudotsuga menziesii)	115.824	380.00	United States	Ashford, Washington	Note: Measured as a fallen tree near the Nisqually river by a US Forest Service Ranger and his crew in the year 1900 with steel tape. A small portion of the tree's top was missing.
Thorpdale Tree	Mountain ash (Eucalyptus regnans)	114.3	375	Australia	Thorpdale, Victoria	Note: Standing height measured at 112.8 metres (370 feet) by theodolite in 1880 by a surveyor. The tree was later felled in 1881, remeasured on the ground by chain at 114.3 metres (375 feet) in length by same surveyor.
Lacey Tree	Douglas-fir (Pseudotsuga menziesii)	107.89	354.0	United States	Lacey, Washington	Felled on August 9, 1857, by homesteader Benjamin F. Whiting and a young George H. Himes while clearing land. Himes, who later became curator of the Oregon Historical Society, recorded that the tree measured 354 ft (107.89 m) in length with a diameter of 9 ft 5 in (2.87 m) at a height of 3 to 4 feet (1-1.22 m) above ground.
	Klinki (Araucaria hunsteinii)	89.0	292.0	Papua New Guinea		Note: all the references to this species are historical accounts – there is no currently known living klinki of this height.
White Knight	Manna gum (Eucalyptus viminalis)	88.9	292	Australia	Fingal, Tasmania	This tree has died, the likely cause being more frequent heatwaves and reduced rainfall.

== Stoutest ==
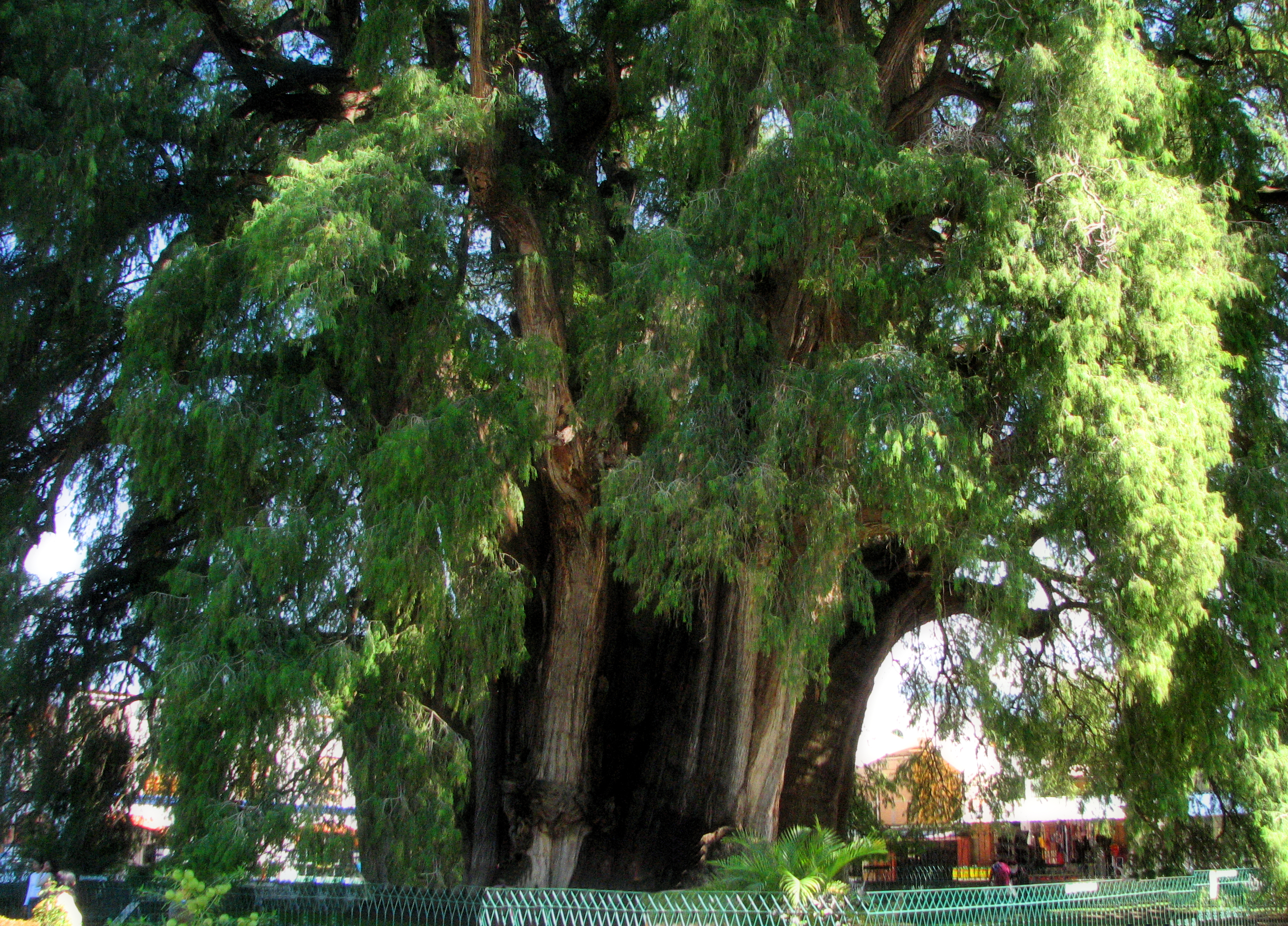
Árbol del Tule

The girth of a tree is usually much easier to measure than the height, as it is a simple matter of stretching a tape round the trunk, and pulling it taut to find the circumference. Despite this, UK tree author Alan Mitchell made the following comment about measurements of yew trees:

The aberrations of past measurements of yews are beyond belief. For example, the tree at Tisbury has a well-defined, clean, if irregular bole at least 1.5 m long. It has been found to have a girth that dilated and shrunk in the following way: 11.28 m (1834 Loudon), 9.3 m (1892 Lowe), 10.67 m (1903 Elwes and Henry), 9.0 m (1924 E. Swanton), 9.45 m (1959 Mitchell) ... Earlier measurements have therefore been omitted.

— Alan Mitchell; in a handbook "Conifers in the British Isles".

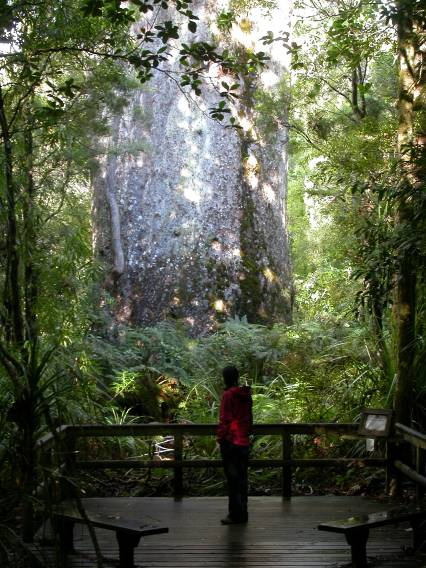
Trunk of Te Matua Ngahere

As a general standard, tree girth is taken at "breast height". This is converted to and cited as dbh (diameter at breast height) in tree and forestry literature. Breast height is defined differently in different situations, with most forestry measurements taking girth at 1.3 m above ground, while those who measure ornamental trees usually measure at 1.5 m above ground; in most cases this makes little difference to the measured girth. On sloping ground, the "above ground" reference point is usually taken as the highest point on the ground touching the trunk, but in North America a point is usually used which is the average of the highest point and the lowest point the tree trunk appears to contact the soil. Some of the inflated old measurements may have been taken at ground level. Some past exaggerated measurements also result from measuring the complete next-to-bark measurement, pushing the tape in and out over every crevice and buttress. The measurements could also be influenced by deviation of the tape measure from a horizontal plane (which might seem called for if the trunk does not grow straight up), and the presence of features such as branches, spikes, etc.

Modern trends are to cite the tree's diameter rather than the circumference. The diameter of the tree is calculated by finding the mean diameter of the trunk, in most cases obtained by dividing the measured circumference by π; this assumes the trunk is mostly circular in cross-section (an oval or irregular cross-section would result in a mean diameter slightly greater than the assumed circle). Accurately measuring circumference or diameter is difficult in species with the large buttresses that are characteristic of many species of rainforest trees. Simple measurement of circumference of such trees can be misleading when the circumference includes much empty space between buttresses. See also Tree girth measurement

Baobabs (genus Adansonia) store large amounts of water in the very soft wood in their trunks. This leads to marked variation in their girth over the year (though not more than about 2.5%), reaching maximum at the end of the rainy season, and minimum at the end of the dry season.

List of stoutest living single-trunk trees by species
Species	Diameter		Tree name	Location	Notes and References
Species	Meters	Feet	Tree name	Location	Notes and References
Montezuma cypress (Taxodium mucronatum)	11.62	38.1	Árbol del Tule	Santa Maria del Tule, Oaxaca, Mexico	This diameter includes buttressing. A more accurate mean diameter for this tree is 9.38 m (30.8 ft).
Baobab (Adansonia digitata):	10.64	34.9	Sunland Baobab	Sunland Farm, Limpopo, South Africa	Renowned because a bar and wine cellar operated inside its hollow trunk, until it split in 2017.
Baobab (Adansonia digitata):	10.8	35	Sagole Baobab	Near Tshipise, Limpopo Province, South Africa	This became the stoutest tree in South Africa after two other large baobabs, the Glencoe and Sunland Baobabs, collapsed in 2009 and 2016 respectively.
White or Strangler Fig (Ficus virens):	9.77	32.1	The Temple Fig	Murwillimbah, NSW, Australia	
Moreton Bay fig (Ficus macrophylla):	9.23	30.3	The Bellingen Fig	Bellingen, NSW, Australia	
Coast redwood (Sequoia sempervirens)	8.90	29.2	Jupiter	Redwood National Park, California, United States	
Giant sequoia (Sequoiadendron giganteum)	8.85	29.0	General Grant	General Grant Grove, California, United States	A hollow, nameless Giant Sequoia along the Paradise Trail of the Atwell Mills Grove in Sequoia National Park, has a basal diameter (not girth) of 57 feet (17 meters).
Za (Adansonia za)	8.85	29.0	The Ampanihy Baobab	North of Morombe, southwest Madagascar	
Chinese camphor tree (Cinnamomum camphora)	8.23	27.0	Kamō no Ōkusu	Kamō, Kagoshima, Japan	
Eucalyptus jacksonii	7.96	26.1	Hollow trunk	Walpole, West Australia, Australia	

Measurements become ambiguous when multiple trunks (whether from an individual tree or multiple trees) grow together. The Sacred Fig grows adventitious roots from its branches, which become new trunks when the root reaches the ground and thickens; a single sacred fig tree can have hundreds of such trunks. The multi-stemmed Hundred Horse Chestnut was known to have a circumference of 57.9 m (190 ft) when it was measured in 1780.

There are known more than 50 species of trees exceeding the diameter of 4.45 m or circumference of 14 m.

== Largest ==
The General Sherman Tree, a California giant sequoia, is the largest tree by volume

The largest trees are defined as having the highest wood volume in a single stem. These trees are both tall and large in diameter and, in particular, hold a large diameter high up the trunk. Measurement is very complex, particularly if branch volume is to be included as well as the trunk volume, so measurements have only been made for a small number of trees, and generally only for the trunk. Few attempts have ever been made to include root or leaf volume.

All 12 of the world's largest trees are giant sequoias. Grogan's Fault, the largest living Coast redwood, would rank as the 13th largest living tree. Tāne Mahuta, the largest living tree outside of California, would rank within the top 100 largest living trees.

List of largest living trees by species, ranked by trunk volume
Species	Trunk volume		Tree name	Location	Country	References and notes
Species	Cubic Meters	Cubic Feet	Tree name	Location	Country	References and notes
Giant sequoia (Sequoiadendron giganteum)	1,487	52,500	General Sherman Tree	Sequoia National Park	United States	
Coast redwood (Sequoia sempervirens)	1,084.5	38,300	Grogan's Fault	Redwood National Park	United States	
Kauri (Agathis australis)	516	18,200	Tāne Mahuta	Waipoua Forest	New Zealand	The 516 cubic meter figure includes 255m³ for the main trunk and 261m³ for branches
Western red cedar (Thuja plicata)	449	15,900	Cheewhat Giant	Pacific Rim National Park Reserve	Canada	
Eucalyptus regnans	390	14,000	Two Towers	Tasmania	Australia	The 390m³ figure includes 358m³ for trunks and 32m³ for branches.
Tasmanian blue gum (Eucalyptus globulus)	368	13,000	Rullah Longatyle	Tasmania	Australia	Rullah Longatyle was killed during Tasmanian bushfires in February 2019.
Coast Douglas-fir (Pseudotsuga menziesii)	349	12,300	Red Creek Fir	San Juan Valley	Canada	Some trees in Washington State, USA have higher tree scores and may have higher volumes.
Sitka spruce (Picea sitchensis)	337	11,900	Queets Spruce	Olympic National Park	United States	
Eucalyptus obliqua	337	11,900	Gothmog	Styx Valley	Australia	The 337m³ figure includes 296m³ for trunks and 41m³ for branches.
Eucalyptus delegatensis	286	10,100		Styx Valley	Australia	This tree was destroyed in the 2019 bushfires.

== Broadest ==
The trees with the broadest crowns have the widest spread of limbs from a single trunk.

List of trees with the broadest crowns, by species
Species	Diameter		Tree name	Location	Notes and References
Species	Meters	Feet	Tree name	Location	Notes and References
Banyan (Ficus benghalensis)	180	591	Thimmamma Marrimanu	Anantapur, Kadiri, Andhra Pradesh, India	This crown is not from a single trunk. It has hundreds of trunks.
Coolibah (Eucalyptus microtheca. synonym Eucalyptus coolibah)	72.8	239	Monkira Monster	Neuragully Waterhole, southwestern Queensland, Australia	Groom's measurement may represent the tree at its prime. It was remeasured in 2008 and found to be "more than 200 meters" (more than 656 feet) in circumference; equivalent to an average limb spread of more than 209 feet (more than 64 meters). The trunk is about ten feet thick (ten meters girth).
Oriental plane (Platanus orientalis)	64.0	210	Oriental Plane Tree at Corsham Court	Wiltshire, England.	
Raintree or monkeypod tree (Samanea saman)	63.1	207	Saman de Guere	San Mateo, Aragua State, Venezuela. Living, but "vetusto" (superannuated, or decrepit).	The widest Monkeypod Tree at present is "Chamchuri" on a military post near Kanchanburi, Thailand, which is 198 ft 1 in (60.38 m) in spread while only 57 ft 8 in (17.58 m) in height. Broadest cantilevered crown (no limbs resting on the ground).
Silk-cotton tree (Ceiba pentandra)	61.3	201	The Big Tree	Barro Colorado Island, Panama	
Live oak (Quercus virginiana)	56.9	187	Angel Oak	Johns Island, South Carolina	
European yew (Taxus baccata)	55.5	182	Shugborough Yew	Shugborough Hall, Staffordshire, England	Broadest gymnosperm.
Sand post oak (Quercus stellata margarettae)	55.2	181		Gilchrist County, Florida	
Turkey oak (Quercus cerris)	53.9	177		Devon, England.	
Moreton Bay fig (Ficus macrophylla)	53.6	176	Moreton Bay fig tree	Chapala Street in Santa Barbara, California.	
Scarlet Oak (Quercus coccinea)	53.6	176		Middlesboro, Kentucky	
Coast live oak (Quercus agrifolia)	53.6	176	The Pechanga Great Oak	Pechanga Native American Reservation east of Temecula, California.	Also 29 m (95 ft) tall.
Montezuma cypress (Taxodium mucronatum)	53.3	175	El Gigante	Santa Maria del Tule, Oaxaca, Mexico	Broadest cantilevered Gymnosperm.
Blackbutt (Eucalyptus pilularis)	51.8	170	Benaroon	John's River in Middle Brother National Park, New South Wales, Australia.	
American sycamore (Platanus occidentalis)	51.5	169	The Lansdowne Sycamore	Lansdowne, Pennsylvania	
African Baobab (Adansonia digitata)	51.2	168	The Glencoe Tree	Huidespruit, Limpopo Province, South Africa.	Now severely damaged
Batai (Albizzia falcata)	50.9	167		Hawai'i	
Green Fig (Ficus virens)	Over fifty meters	over 165 feet.	(no individual name)	Boar's Pocket, northern Queensland	crown shades "over 2,000 sq. meters"

== Oldest ==
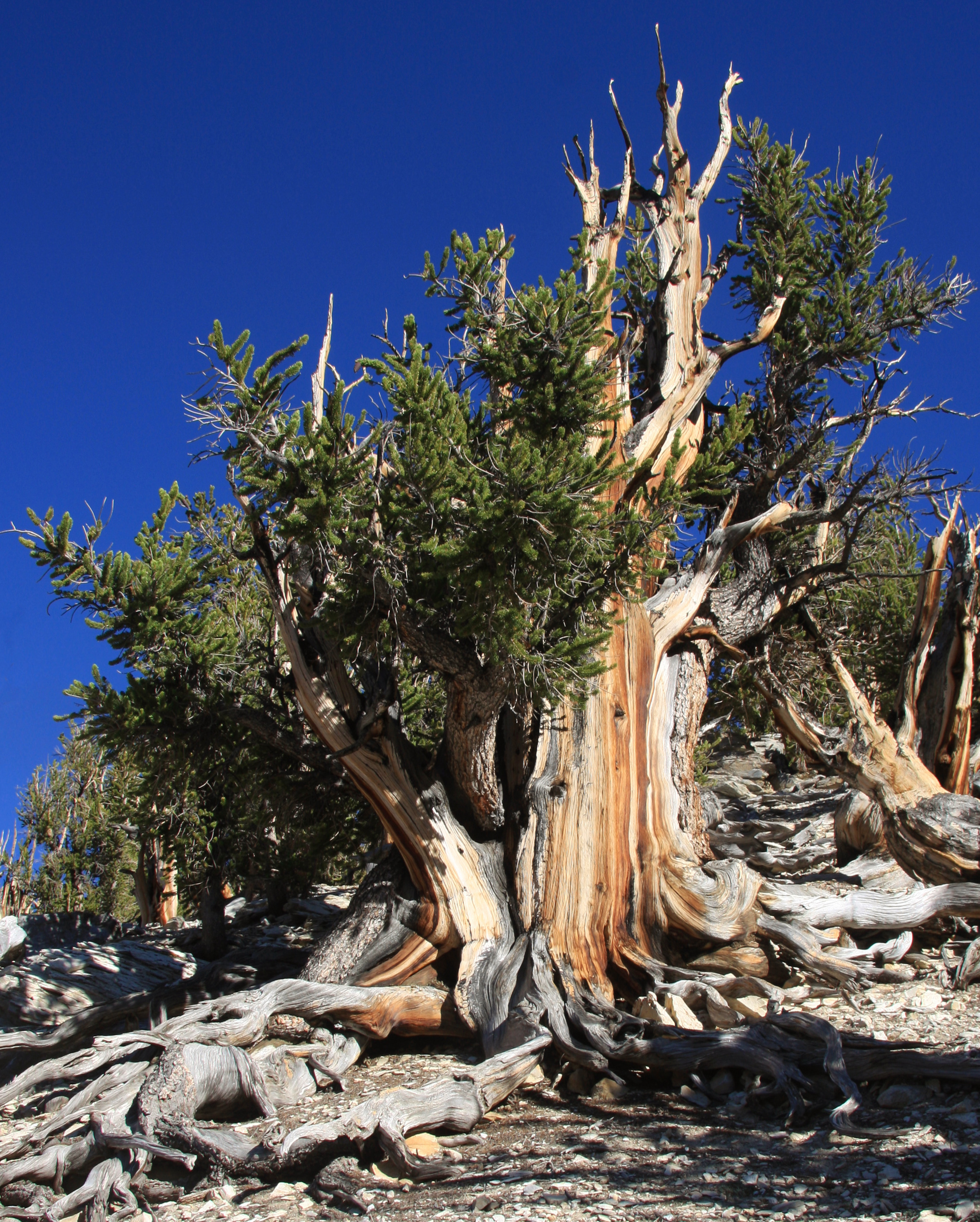
Great Basin bristlecone pine (Pinus longaeva) is the longest living tree species on Earth.

The oldest trees are determined by growth rings, which can be seen if the tree is cut down, or in cores taken from the bark to the center of the tree. Accurate determination is only possible for trees that produce growth rings, generally those in seasonal climates. Trees in uniform non-seasonal tropical climates grow continuously and do not have distinct growth rings. It is also only possible for trees that are solid to the center. Many very old trees become hollow as the dead heartwood decays. For some of these species, age estimates have been made on the basis of extrapolating current growth rates, but the results are usually largely speculation. White (1998) proposes a method of estimating the age of large and veteran trees in the United Kingdom through the correlation of a tree's age with its diameter and growth character.

The verified oldest measured ages are:

List of oldest non-clonal trees by species
Species	Age (years)	Tree name	Location	Notes and References
Great Basin bristlecone pine (Pinus longaeva)	4,858	Methuselah	Inyo County, California, United States	
Giant sequoia (Sequoiadendron giganteum)	3,266		Sierra Nevada, California, USA	Dead
Western juniper (Juniperus occidentalis)	2,675		Sierra Nevada, California, USA	Dead
Bald Cypress (Taxodium distichum)	2,651		North Carolina, USA	
Rocky Mountain Bristlecone Pine (Pinus aristata)	2,469		central Colorado, USA	
African Baobab (Adansonia digitata)	2,419		Matabeleland, Zimbabwe	
Sacred fig (Ficus religiosa)	2,302		Anuradhapura, Sri Lanka	
Przewalski's juniper (Juniperus przewalskii)	2,230		Delingha, Qinghai Province, China	
Coast Redwood (Sequoia sempervirens)	2,200		northern California, USA	Dead
Saharan Cypress (Cupressus dupreziana)	2,200		Wadi Tichouinet, southern Algeria.	
Foxtail pine (Pinus balfouriana)	2,110		Sierra Nevada, California, USA	

Other species suspected of reaching exceptional age include European Yew (Taxus baccata) (probably over 5,000 years), Sugi (Cryptomeria japonica) (3,000 years or more), and Western Redcedar (Thuja plicata). The oldest known European Yew may be the Llangernyw Yew in the Churchyard of Llangernyw village in North Wales, or the Fortingall Yew in Perthshire, Scotland. The Llangernyw Yew has been estimated as between 4000 and 5000 years in age by David Bellamy, who also used radiocarbon dating to estimate an age of around 4000 years for the Tisbury Yew in Wiltshire, while the Fortingall Yew with its former 16 to 17-meter girth is estimated at 5,000 years of age. However, ageing yews is very difficult due to the loss of heartwood in very ancient trees, and one or two sources believe the trees to be far younger at around 1500–3000 years.

Lagarostrobos franklinii, known as Huon pine, is native to the wet southwestern corner of Tasmania, Australia. A stand of trees in excess of 10,500 years old was found in 1955 in western Tasmania on Mount Read. Each of the trees in this stand is a genetically identical male that has reproduced vegetatively. Although no single tree in this stand is of that age, the stand itself as a single organism has existed that long. Individual trees in the clonal patch have been listed as having ages of 2000 or even to 3000 years old.

The olive tree also can live for centuries. Previously the oldest age verified by carbon dating was 900 years for a tree in the Gethsemane garden in Jerusalem. In 2024 research was published showing that one of the trees in the Sisters Olive Trees of Noah to be 1,163 years old, plus or minus 131 years, by carbon dating. Previously they had been reputed to be around 6,000 years old.

== Deepest and longest tree roots ==
A wild fig tree growing in Echo Caves near Ohrigstad, South Africa has roots going 120 m (400 ft) deep, giving it the deepest roots known of any tree. El Drago Milenario, a tree of species Dracaena draco on Tenerife, Canary Islands, Spain, is reported to have 200-meter-long (660 ft) superficial roots.

== Thickest tree limbs ==
This list is limited to horizontal or nearly horizontal limbs, in which the governing growth factor is phototropism. Vertical or near vertical limbs, in which the governing growth factor is negative geotropism, are called "reiterations" and are really divisions of the trunk, which by definition must be less than the trunk as a whole and therefore less remarkable. The thickest trunks have already been dealt with under "stoutest".

List of thickest tree limbs by species
Species	Diameter		Tree name	Location	Notes and References
Species	Meters	Feet	Tree name	Location	Notes and References
Giant sequoia (Sequoiadendron giganteum)	3.8	12.6	The Big Limb Tree	Atwell Mill Grove, Sequoia National Park, California	
Za (Adansonia za)	2.7	9	The Ampanihy Baobab	north of Morombe, Madagascar	Thickest limb on a dicot
African baobab (Adansonia digitata)	2.4	8	The Big Tree	Messina Nature Reserve, Limpopo Province, South Africa	
Coast redwood (Sequoia sempervirens)	2.1	7	Kronos	Atlas Grove, Prairie Creek Redwoods State Park	
Kauri (Agathis australis)	2.1	7	Nga Mahangahua	Tutamoe State Forest, North Island, New Zealand	
White oak (Quercus alba)	1.8	6	The Wye Oak	Wye Mills, Maryland	Died June 6, 2002
Kapok or Silk Cotton Tree (Ceiba pentandra)	1.8	6		General statement; no individual cited	
Canary Island Dragon Tree (Dracaena draco)	1.75	5.75	The Orotava Tree	Orotava, Tenerife, Canary Islands	Died October 1869; thickest limb on a monocot
Moreton Bay fig (Ficus macrophylla)	1.7	5.5 or more	The Children's Tree	Sydney Royal Botanical Gardens, Sydney, Australia	
Silver Fir (Abies alba)	1.7	5.5	Sabin Candelabre	Jura Alps of France, near the Swiss border	
Rain Tree (Samanea saman)	1.5	4.9		Caribbean region – this one near Nagarote, Nicaragua	Measured by Dr. Berthold Seemann.
California Live Oak (Quercus agrifolia)	1.5	4.9		Six kilometers (four miles) west of Gilroy, California	

== See also ==
- Champion Trees
- Dendrology
- Dendrometry
- Largest organisms
- List of individual trees
- Lists of trees
- List of oldest trees
- List of old-growth forests
- List of superlative trees in Sweden
- List of Champion Trees (South Africa)
- List of tree genera
- List of trees and shrubs by taxonomic family
- List of world records held by plants
- Tree allometry
- Tree measurement
  - Tree crown measurement
  - Tree girth measurement
  - Tree height measurement
  - Tree volume measurement
