= Duncan Cedar =

World's tallest Cedar tree

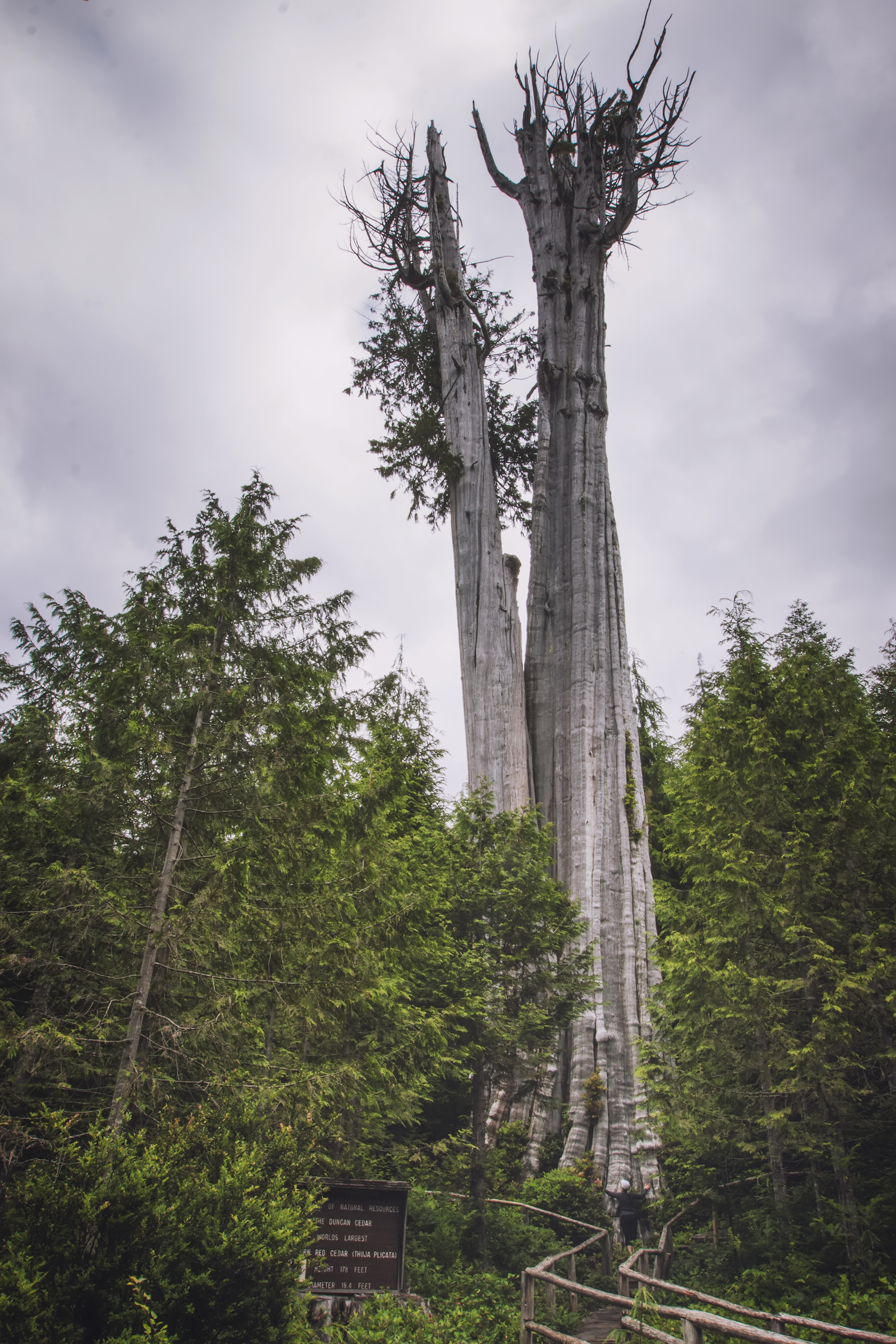
- The Duncan Memorial Cedar in 2016
- Interactive map of Duncan Cedar
- Species: Western redcedar (Thuja plicata)
- Coordinates: 47°43′10.5″N 124°18′54.2″W
- Height: 178 ft (54 m)
- Diameter: 19.4 ft (5.9 m)
- Volume of trunk: 434 m^{3} (15,330 cu ft)

The Duncan Cedar, also known as the Duncan Memorial Cedar and the Nolan Creek Tree, is a large specimen of Western red cedar. The tree is located on the Olympic Peninsula in the U.S. state of Washington. It is currently the largest known Western redcedar in the world, (compare to the Cheewhat Giant on Canada's Vancouver Island.

After the death in 2016 of the Quinault Big Cedar, the Duncan Cedar became the largest known Western redcedar in the United States by volume. It is also the largest tree of any species in Washington state, and among the largest trees on earth outside of California's remaining old-growth Redwood forests.

The Duncan Cedar is located in Jefferson County, approximately 15 miles south of Forks, WA, off of U.S. Route 101 on land managed by the Washington State Department of Natural Resources and is accessible only by traveling about 4 miles on unpaved logging roads. (Personally visited 25-May-2023). The tree is surrounded by second growth forest that has grown up after the original old-growth rainforest in this area was clearcut by commercial logging interests in the mid-20th century. The tree was discovered by Wiley and Ed Duncan, Rayonier Co. loggers when they were cutting the state timber sale in 1975. The tree, 19.4 feet in diameter and 178 feet tall is also 1,000 years old. Located on Department of Natural Resource state school trust lands, the Forks, Washington Lions Club lobbied the Commissioner to remove the tree from the timber sale. Their successful efforts caused the tree to be renamed, “The Duncan Cedar” in honor of the two loggers.

The Duncan Cedar is estimated to be over 1,000 years old. Most of the tree is dead, with the exception of a strip of bark on one of the trunks. However, due to redcedar's natural resilience to pests and rot, the Duncan Cedar is not necessarily in poor health. According to University of Washington Forestry Professor Robert Van Pelt, the tree may live for many more centuries, unless destroyed by wind, fire, or human intervention.

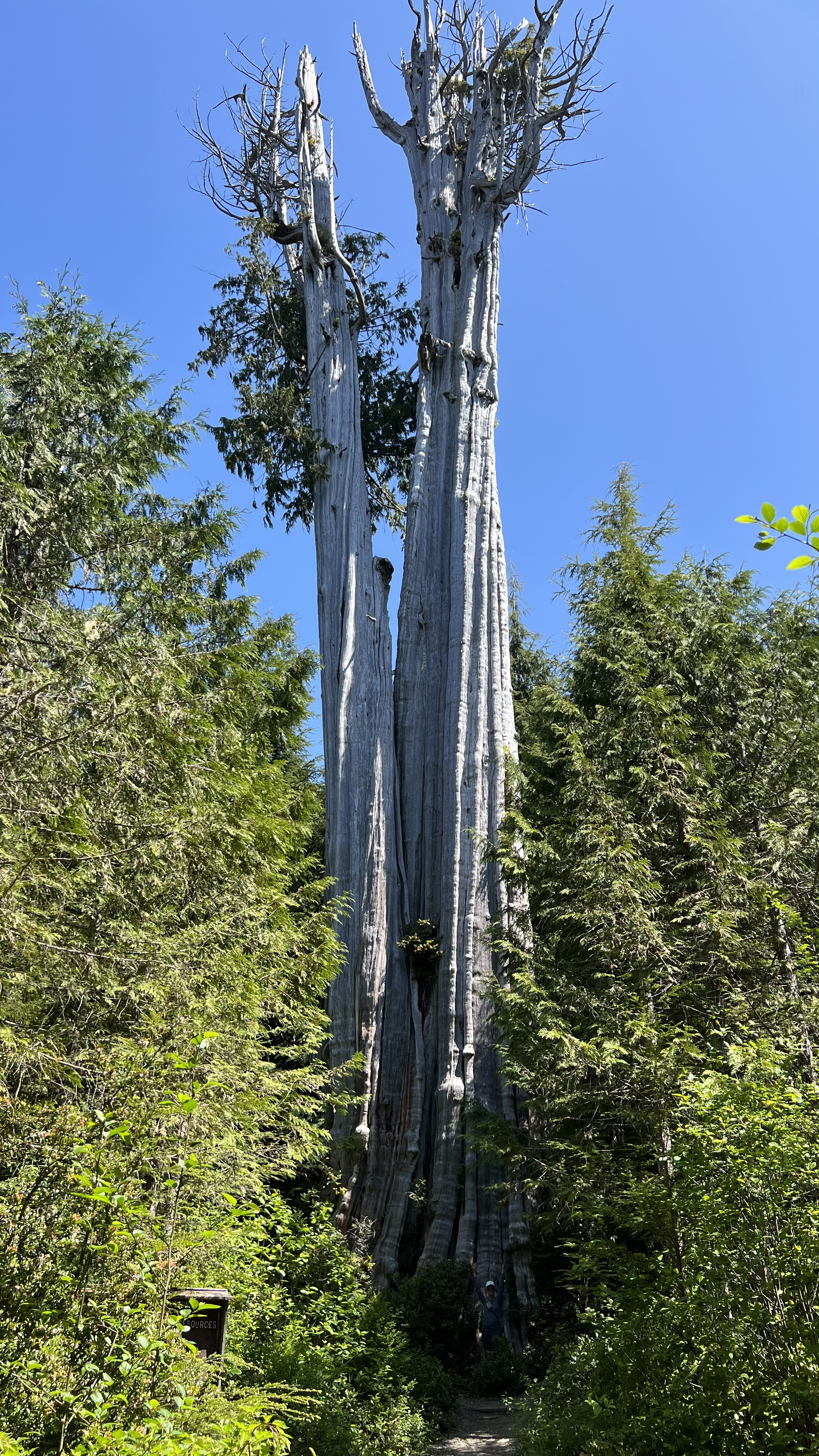
Duncan Memorial Western Redcedar (World's largest) Near Forks, Washington 25-May-2023

== See also ==
- List of individual trees
