= Champion Trees of South Africa =

Trees of significance in South Africa

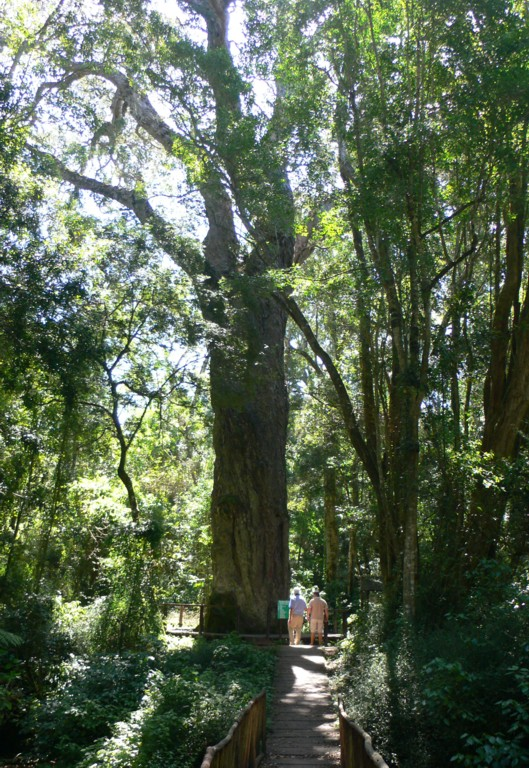
The Big Tree, an 800 year old Outeniqua yellowwood at Tsitsikamma National Park.

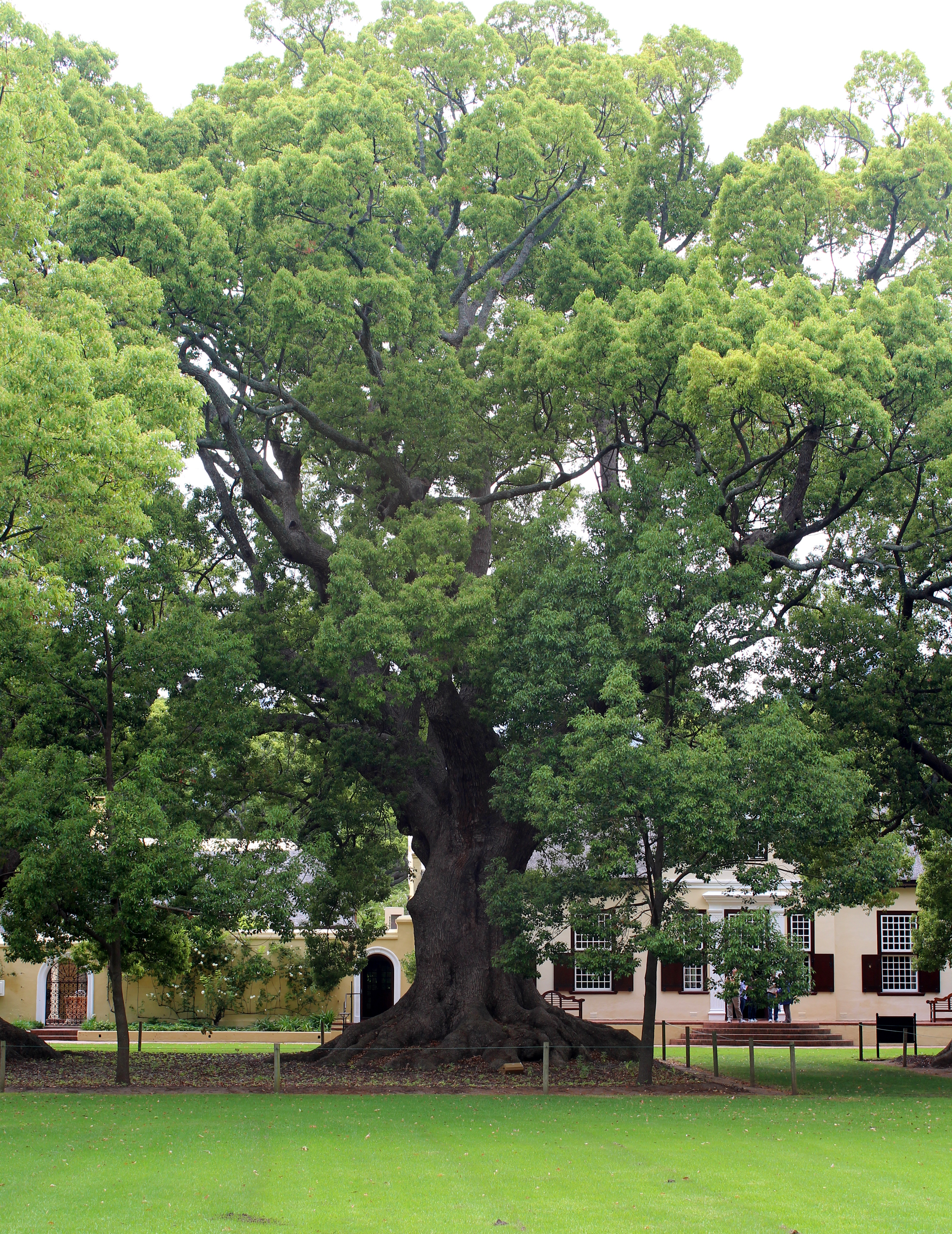
One of five camphor trees (Cinnamomum camphora) at Vergelegen, Somerset West. These trees were planted between 1700 and 1706 by then governor of the Cape Colony, Willem Adriaan van der Stel. The five trees are over 26 metres in height and each of their trunks have a girth of 7 metres (measured at a height of 3 metres)

Champion Trees in South Africa are individual trees or groves that have been identified as having special significance, and therefore protected under the National Forests Act of 1998 by the Department of Forestry, Fisheries and the Environment.

== History ==
In 2003, the Department of Agriculture, Forestry and Fisheries initiated the project to identify and grant special status to indigenous and non-indigenous trees in South Africa that meet certain set criteria. From May to July 2003, workshops were held in Gauteng, KwaZulu-Natal and the Western Cape to gain consensus from experts to assist in the identification process of exceptional trees (Champion Trees) that are worthy of special protection throughout South Africa.

The Department of Agriculture, Forestry and Fisheries initiated the Champion Trees Project with the purpose of identifying exceptional trees and regulating for their special protection using the National Forests Act of 1998 (NFA). Section 12(1) of the National Forests Act states that the Minister of Forestry, Fisheries and the Environment can declare certain tree species and individual trees or groups of trees as protected. Under Section 15(1)(a) of the National Forests Act, such protected trees may not be "...cut, disturbed or damaged and their products may not be possessed, sold or transported without a licence...". In the case of individual trees, the protection is absolute, with no potential for permission for removal except if life or property is threatened (e.g. by dying or leaning trees).

One of the outcomes of the Department's Champion Trees Project is to gazette a list of Champion trees as part of the National Forests Act.

=== Criteria for selection of a Champion Tree ===
Any person can nominate a tree for selection. Individual trees or groups of trees proposed for Champion status should have the following attributes:

- Must fit the definition of a tree;
- Must be living or dying only;
- Can be indigenous or non-indigenous;
- May be in protected areas or in botanical gardens;
- May be listed as protected in other pieces of legislation; and
- Must be evaluated against a system of categories and criteria to merit Champion status.

Additional criteria that define a tree's eligibility are biological attributes, the age of the tree, and heritage or historical significance.

==== Biological attributes ====
Champion trees can be designated on a range of singular biological attributes:

- Diameter (d)
- Height (h)
- Crown spread (2r)

The Dendrological Society of South Africa, which maintains the National Register of Big Trees in South Africa, uses a formula of the combination of the three biological attributes to obtain the Size Index (SI):
$$SI = \sqrt[](d) \cdot h \cdot \sqrt[](2r)$$
This formula has been implemented to determine a tree's Champion status.

==== Tree age ====
The National Forests Act recommends that trees considered for Champion Tree status on the basis of age should be at least 120 years old.

==== Heritage Significance ====
This criterion should take into account the particular value associated with the tree, and graded on a scale of 1-10 (>6 is a potential candidate for Champion Tree status):

- Aesthetic value (image of the tree)
- Landscape value (enhancement of the landscape)
- Historical value (related to a past event or icon)
- Cultural value (of ongoing importance to a cultural group)
- Economic value (able to generate economic benefits such as through ecotourism)

== Designated Champion Trees ==
As of 2018, 93 trees have been designated Champion Trees.

indicates a de-listed tree.

List of Champion Trees
Champion Tree (Register Number)	Tree Species	Common Name	Description	Tree Size	Size Index	Location	Image
1	Adansonia digitata (Baobab)	Sagole Baobab	The largest indigenous tree of South Africa, and habitat for a rare colony of mottled spinetail swifts.	Height: 22 m Stem size: 33.72 m Crown size: 34.3 m & 41.7 m	440	Sagole, Limpopo 22°29.994′S 30°37.990′E	
2	Adansonia digitata	Glencoe Baobab	Second-largest indigenous tree of South Africa. It's carbon dated to be from 181 CE (1844–1845 years old). Tree de-listed after it was damaged.	Height: 16 m Stem size: 46.6 m Crown size: 41.5 m & 34.2 m	413	Glencoe Farm Hoedspruit, Limpopo 24°22′26.2″S 30°51′27.5″E	
3	Ficus salicifolia	Wonderboom fig of Pretoria	Largest Wonderboom fig. It is about 1000 years old and historic. An ox wagon outspan area in earlier years. It also shares a legend that a local chief was buried under the tree.	Height: 22 m Stem size: many sub-trees – 2.56 m to 7.14 m Crown size: 61.2 m & 51.9 m	380	Wonderboom Nature Reserve, Pretoria 25°41′14″S 28°11′30.5″E	
4	Breonadia salicina (Matumi)	Largest of a trio of trees called The Three Queens	Largest Matumi tree in South Africa	Height: 40 m Stem size: 8.3 m Crown size: 34.6 m	363	Amorentia Estate, Mooketsi valley, Limpopo 23°45.892′S 30°02.921′E	
5	Breonadia salicina (Matumi)	Second-largest of a trio of trees called The Three Queens	Second-largest Matumi tree in South Africa	Height: 38 m Stem size: 8.17 m Crown size: 25.4 m & 24.4 m	306	Amorentia Estate, Mooketsi Valley, Limpopo 23°46.065′S 30°02.855′E	
6	Breonadia salicina (Matumi)	Third-largest of a trio of trees called The Three Queens	Third-largest Matumi tree in South Africa	Height: 38 m Stem size: 2.41 m	286	Amorentia Estate, Mooketsi Valley, Limpopo 23°46.065′S 30°02.855′E	
7	Adansonia digitata (Baobab)	Platland Tree or Sunland Baobab	Very large baobab and well-known tourist attraction. Tree split in 2017.	Height: 19 m Stem size: 33.6 m Crown size: 33.7 m & 30.2 m	340	Sunland Estate, Platland, Duiwelskloof (Modjadjiskloof), Limpopo 23°37.261′S 30°11.888′E	
8	Ficus sycomorus (Common cluster fig)	Cluster Fig Giant	The largest cluster fig in South Africa, after demise of the largest fig in KwaZulu-Natal	Height: 31 m Stem size: 10.7 m Crown size: 38.2 m & 38.10 m	336	The farm Excellence, Hoedspruit, Limpopo 24°10′42.9″S 30°50′06.2″E	
9	Afrocarpus falcatus (Outeniqua yellowwood)	King Edward VII Tree	Largest Outeniqua yellowwood accessible to tourists in South Africa	Height: 39 m Stem size: 6.92 m Crown size: 33.5 m	316	Diepwalle Forest Estate, Garden Route National Park, Western Cape	
10	Eucalyptus saligna (Sydney blue gum)	The O'Connor tree lane	Very tall tree lane. It was planted in the 1930s by forestry pioneer AJ O'Connor. The landmark visible from various viewpoints. Situated next to O'Connor's memorial.	Height: 73 m Stem size: 4.28 m Crown size: 32.1 m	482	Woodbush Plantation, Haenertsburg, Limpopo 23°51′2.6″S 29°59′13.8″E	
11	Eucalyptus saligna (Sydney blue gum)	Part of "The Magoebaskloof Triplets"	The tallest tree in South Africa and Africa. And the tallest planted tree in the world. Stand of trees planted in 1906 (119–120 years old) by forestry pioneer AK Eastwood. Previous tallest tree in this stand fell in 2006.	Height: 1. 79 m 2. 78.5 m; Stem size: 1. 3.2 m 2. 4.28 m; Crown size: 1. 20.7 m 2. 22.7 m	293	Woodbush Plantation, Haenertsburg, Limpopo 23°48.6′S 29°59.024′E	
12	Sideroxylon inerme (Milkwood)	Grandfather of Still Bay	Largest milkwood in South Africa; estimated to be about 1000 years old	Height: 14 m Stem size: 10.01 m Crown size: 22.1 m & 17.9 m	111	Langebosch farm, Stillbaai, Western Cape	
13	Sideroxylon inerme (Milkwood)	Post Office Tree	Historic tree believed to have been the tree in which an old shoe was placed for exchange of messages by Portuguese seafarers in the 16th century	Height: 8.5 m Stem size: 2.3 m; 2.66 m (multi-stemmed); Crown size: 32.1 m & 33.7 m	51	Bartolomeu Dias Museum Complex, 1 Market Street, Mossel Bay, Western Cape 34°10.819′S 22°08.486′E	
14	Cinnamomum camphora (Camphor tree)	The Vergelegen trees	Historic trees planted more than 3 centuries ago by Governor WA van der Stel. They are very large trees, with a large landscape impact	Height: 26.3 m Stem size: 12.62 m (at breast height – trunk forms a thickened foot). 7 m from 3 m height. Crown size: 33.51 m & 29.3 m	295	Vergelegen Wines, Somerset West, Western Cape 34°4.611′S 18°53.389′E	
15	Eucalyptus species & a variety of other tree species		The Tokai Arboretum, situated in the Tokai State forest (Note: As proclaimed in 1985 under the War Graves and National Monuments Act of 1969 (Act No 28 of 1969) - now replaced by the National Heritage Resources Act of 1999 (Act No 25 of 1999)) is of historic significance, with trees planted there since 1885 (140–141 years old). Laid out by Joseph Storr Lister at the beginning of the forestry industry. A major landmark and recreation area, and world famous among botanists, horticulturists and sylviculturists.	Height: 68 m (saligna) & 43 m (P radiata); Stem size: 5.4 m (E. saligna) & 4.64 m (P. radiata); Crown size: 22.4 m & 23.7 m (E. saligna) & 25.4 m & 25.1 m (P. radiata)	368	Tokai Arboretum, Tokai Road, Table Mountain National Park, Cape Town, Western Cape	
16	Platanus × hispanica (London plane)	Marriot's Lane	Tree avenue of exceptionally old plane trees of historic value; planted in 1908 (117–118 years old) by the curator, W. E. Marriot. Trees are a central landscape feature of the botanical gardens.	Height: 1: 35 m 2: 37 m 3: 35 m Stem size: 1: 4.89 m 2: 5.59 m 3: 3.27 m Crown size: 1: 28.7 m 2: 33.9 m 3: 26.7 m	287 (Tree 2)	KwaZulu-Natal National Botanical Gardens, Pietermaritzburg, Kwa-Zulu Natal	
17	Eucalyptus camaldulensis (River red gum)	The Irene Champions	Estate land, parts of which were originally bought by General Jan Smuts, with a variety of trees planted since the late 19th century.	Height: 44 m Stem size: 2.57 m Crown size: 6.44 m	296	Irene Farm Estate, Pretoria, Gauteng 25°52′45.0″S 28°12′44.0″E	
18	Eucalyptus paniculata (grey ironbark), maculata (spotted gum), E. microcorys (tallow gum)	Commonwealth plantation	Arboretum or sample plot of large Eucalyptus trees planted in the 1930s and protected to commemorate the Commonwealth Forestry Conference of 1935.	Height: 70 m (E. paniculata) & 72 m (E. microrys) & 71 m (E. maculata); Stem size: 4.07 m (E. paniculata) & 3.78 m (E. microrys) & 3.29 m (E. maculata); Crown size: 21.4 m & 17.4 m (E. paniculata) & 24.2 m & 23.5 m (E. microrys) & 22.7 m (E. maculata)	350	Middelkop Plantation, Haenertsburg, Limpopo 23°49.187′S 30°04.011′E	
19	Eucalyptus saligna	Westfalia Showblock	Stand of tall trees Eucalyptus saligna trees planted in 1933 (92–93 years old) by Hans Merensky.	Height: 1) 72 m 2) 72 m 3) 71 m Stem size: 1) 3.93 m 2) 3.91 m 3) 4.4 m (tree3); Crown size: 1) 19.3 m 14.6 m 2) 14.3 m & 12.7 m 3) 21.8 m & 16.5 m (tree3)	322	Westfalia Estate, Tzaneen, Limpopo 23°43.898′S 30°06.506′E	
20	Araucaria heterophylla (Norfolk Island pine)	Kweekskoolboom	Tallest Norfolk Island pine planted in 1826 (199–200 years old) by wife of the last landdrost of Stellenbosch.	Height: 46 m Stem size: 5.98 m Crown size: 22.4 m & 20.02 m	292	Faculty of Theology, Stellenbosch University, Dorp Street, Stellenbosch, Western Cape 33°56.323′S 18°51.863′E	
21	Eucalyptus camaldulensis (River red gum)	Bergzicht Market Trees	Planted in 1880 (145–146 years old). Prominent trees providing shade for an entire informal market.	Height: 34.5 m Stem size: 7.3 m Crown size: 34.1 m & 35.9 m	311	Cnr of Bird and Merriman Streets, Stellenbosch, Western Cape 33°55′57.4″S 18°51′29.3″E	
22	Quercus robur (English oak)	The Ryneveld Oak	Planted in 1812 (213–214 years old). One of only 5 oak trees remaining from the previous generation of planted oak trees.	Height: 29 m Stem size: 4.67 m Crown size: 16.25 m & 19 m	148	6 Ryneveld Street Stellenbosch, Western Cape 33°56.297′S 18°51.790′E	
23	Quercus robur (English oak)	Zandvliet Oak	One of the biggest oaks in the district, located at a historic farmhouse of an old wine estate.	Height: 22 m Stem size: 4.86 m Crown size: 25.08 m	137	Zandvliet Delta Estate, Groot Drakenstein 33°51.781′S 18°59.428′E	
24	Populus nigra (Lombardy poplar)	Ruth Fischer Tree	The tree stands at the site where Ruth Fischer, daughter of Bram Fischer, ran a safe house for fugitives from the Apartheid security forces. The tree served as landmark for those seeking this safe house.	Height: 22 m Stem size: 3.52 m Crown size: 5.89 m	56	Corner of Fawley and Lothbury Avenue, Johannesburg, Gauteng 26°10.940′S 28°00.401′E	
25	Podocarpus falacatus (Outeniqua yellowwood)	Tsitsikamma Big Tree	One of the most accessible and famous big trees in the Tsitsikamma Forest. Visited by more than 80 000 tourists each year.	Height: 36 m Stem size: 9.15 m Crown size: 34 m	379	Near Storms River, Plaatbos Nature Reserve, Garden Route National Park, Eastern Cape 33°57′57″S 23°53′48″E	
26	Afrocarpus falcatus (Outeniqua yellowwood)	Woodville Big Tree	One of the largest yellowwoods in the Knysna forests, receiving substantial numbers of visitors.	Height: 33.5 m Stem size: 8.9 m Crown size: 29.8 m & 29.5 m	314	Collin's Hoek, Bergplaas Forest Estate, Garden Route National Park, Western Cape 33°56′03″S 22°38′42″E	
27	Afrocarpus falcatus (Outeniqua yellowwood)	Eastern Monarch	One of the largest trees in Eastern Cape, and located next to Tyume hiking trail.	Height: 39.4 m Stem size: 8.5 m Crown size: 29.69 m	355	Auckland Nature Reserve, Keiskamma Forest Estate, Eastern Cape	
28	Afrocarpus falcatus (Outeniqua yellowwood)	The Dalene Matthee Big Tree	Landmark tree towering above the forest, and the site of a memorial to writer Dalene Matthee.	Height: 35.4 m Stem size: 5.4 m Crown size: 28.35 m	247	Goudveld, Garden Route National Park, Western Cape 33°55′00″S 22°57′30″E	
29	Quercus robur (English oak)	Slave tree	Very large oak tree planted in 1811 (214–215 years ago) - one of the biggest in the southern hemisphere. De-listed after tree was damaged.	Height: 24 m Stem size: 5.7 m Crown size: 29 m & 25.8 m	81	George Tourism Bureau, 124 York Street, Western Cape 33°57.396′S 22°27.546′E	
30	Cedrus deodara and Cypressus sempervirens	President Brand trees	Historic collection of trees of different species planted by visiting dignitaries since 1879 in front of the old government buildings in President Brand Street, Bloemfontein. De-listed after all the trees died and were replaced.	Height: 20 m (Cedrus deodara) & 27 m (Cypressus sempervirens); Stem size: 3.1 m (Cedrus deodara) & 2.14 m (Cypressus sempervirens); Crown size: 16.9 m (Cedrus deodara) & 9.7 m (Cypressus sempervirens)		Old Government Buildings, President Brand Street, Bloemfontein, Free State 29°06.96′S 26°12.99′E	
31	Quercus robur (English oak)	Sophiatown Oak and The Hanging Tree	The first individual tree proclaimed as protected under the National Forests Act. It was mutilated and died, but site is still of historic significance. The tree was part of the history of Sophiatown and the struggle against the forced removal of the community in the 1950s. The site will be memorialised.	Height: 18 m Stem size: 4.48 m Crown size:32 m	128	8 Bertha Street Sophiatown, Johannesburg, Gauteng 26°10.792′S 27°58.817′E	
32	Eucalyptus ficifolia (Red flowering gum)	Ida's Valley Giant	Very large and attractive tree, estimated to be more than 2 centuries old. A landmark on an old historic farm.	Height: 23 m Stem size: 5.14 m, 4.31 m, 2.95 m & 0.79 m Crown size: 25.4 m & 24.4 m	169	Ida's Valley Homestead, Stellenbosch, Western Cape	Ida's Valley Champion Tree in Stellenbosch on YouTube
33	Quercus robur (English oak)	Northcliff Oak	The largest and oldest measured oak tree in Gauteng, and an impressive landmark.	Height: 22 m Stem size: 5.96 m Crown size: 29.4 m	164	Kirchmont Heights, 4 Koelenhof Road, Northcliff, Johannesburg, Gauteng 26°09′57.8″S 27°57′33.2″E	
34	Ficus macrophylla (Moreton Bay fig)	Wedding Tree and Arderne Fig Tree	Largest tree in the Western Cape	Height: 32.5 m Stem size: 11.89 m Crown size: 44.3 m	347	Arderne Gardens, Claremont, Cape Town, Western Cape	
35	Araucaria heterophylla (Norfolk Island pine)	The Grand Norfolk Pine and The Arderne Pine	Exceptionally tall tree, even for its kind.	Height: 42.6 m Stem size: 5.75 m Crown size: 19.09 m	252	Arderne Gardens, Claremont, Cape Town, Western Cape	
36	Quercus suber (Cork oak)	Arderne Cork Oak	Landmark tree planted by tree pioneers Ralph and Henry Arderne. (Note: Planted more than a century ago by John Arderne and his son.)	Height: 15.5 m Stem size: 4.4 m Crown size: 27.08 m & 25.75 m	101	Arderne Gardens, Claremont, Cape Town, Western Cape	
37	Quercus cerris (Turkey oak)	Arderne Turkey Oak	Landmark tree planted by tree pioneers Ralph and Henry Arderne. Tree collapsed in October 2023.	Height: 21.56 m Stem size: 5.9 m Crown size: 28.75 m & 29.7 m	159	Arderne Gardens, Claremont, Cape Town, Western Cape	
38	Pinus halepensis (Aleppo pine)	Arderne Aleppo Pine	One of the largest and oldest trees in Arderne Gardens.	Height: 35 m Stem size: 5.46 m Crown size: 31.85 m & 32 m	241	Arderne Gardens, Claremont, Cape Town, Western Cape	
39	Agathis robusta (Queensland kauri)	Arderne Kauri	One of the largest and oldest trees in Arderne Gardens.	Height: 27.7 m Stem size: 4.94 m Crown size: 26.6 m & 26.3 m	179	Arderne Gardens, Claremont, Cape Town, Western Cape	
40	Eucalyptus diversicolor (Karri gum)	Brackenhill Gum Trees	Tallest stand of karri gum in the country, planted in 1922 (103–104 years old).	Height: 70 m Stem size: 4.6 m Crown size: 26.34 m & 25.2 m	429	Kruisfontein State Forest, Harkerville, Western Cape	
41	Casuarina cunninghamiana (Beefwood)	Scanlen's Lane	Lane of large casuarinas planted in the 1860s by Charles Scanlen.	Height: 1) 27 m 2)27 m 3) 27 m Stem size: 1) 5.18 m 2) 5.81 m 3) 5.82 m Crown size: 1) 22.7 m 2) 22.92 m 3) 23.12 m	177 (Tree 3)	Municipal Recreation Grounds, Cradock, Eastern Cape 32°09.79′S 25°36.86′E	
42	Quercus robur (English oak)	Van der Stel's Oak Tree	Oak tree planted 3 centuries ago. It is the largest and oldest oak tree in the country.	Height: 14 m Stem size: 10.73 m Crown size: 22.1 m	121	Vergelegen Wines, Somerset West, Western Cape 34°04.560′S 18°53.392′E	
43	Eucalyptus regnans (Mountain ash)	The Benvie Trees	The tallest tree measured in the KwaZulu-Natal Midlands to date. The trio are situated on the scenic Benvie Arboretum, and established by Scottish emigrant John Geekie more than 80 years ago.	Height: 61 m Stem size: 6.85 m Crown size: 27.1 m & 28.6 m	475	Benvie Farm, New Hanover, KwaZulu-Natal 29°15.151′S 30°22.116′E	
44	Pinus radiata (Monterey pine)	The Eastern Cape Pine	Tallest pine tree in the Eastern Cape. Planted in late 1880s by forest workers as part of an early tree plantation.	Height: 51 m Stem size: 4.74 m Crown size: 15.5 m	247	Isidenge State Forest, near Stutterheim, Eastern Cape 32°40.049′S 27°16.754′E	
45	Corymbia citriodora (Lemon scented gum)	Paul Roos Trees	Very attractive group of big trees in scenic setting on campus grounds.	Height: 1) 39 m 2) 41 m 3) 42 m Stem size: 1) 2.4 m 2) 1.33 m 3) 1.26 m Crown size: 1) 21.7 m & 22.5 m 2) 30.3 m & 27.3 m 3) 30.3 m & 19.9 m	284 (Tree 1)	Campus of Paul Roos Gymnasium, Welgelegen, Stellenbosch, Western Cape 33°56.25′S 18°51.54′E	
46	Quercus robur (English oak)	Bonniemile Oak	Large oak tree on farmyard next to the original wagon route linking Stellenbosch with Cape Town. Locals claim that W. A. van der Stel granted land to his coachmen, who planted the trees.	Height: 24 m Stem size: 5.16 m Crown size: 33 m & 34 m	178	Bonniemile, Stellenbosch, Western Cape 33°02.31′S 18°46.00′E	
47	Eucalyptus camaldulensis (Red river gum)	The Ruth Steer Tree	The tree plays a very prominent role in the landscape on the river plateau of Stellenbosch. It is the same size as the Bergzicht Tree and was thus probably also planted c. 1880.	Height: 33 m Stem size: 7.87 m Crown size: 32.6 m & 33.7 m	301	60 Jonkershoek Avenue, Stellenbosch, Western Cape 33°56.044′S 18°53.00′E	
48	Eucalyptus camaldulensis (River red gum)	Wits Campus Tree	Large Eucalyptus planted more than 80 years ago adjacent to the entrance to Johannesburg on the old Rustenburg road.	Height: 34 m Stem size: 7.45 m Crown size: 36.4 m & 38.7 m	321	Gavin Reilly Green, West campus WITS, Johannesburg, Gauteng 26°11′15.540″S 28°1′30.518″E	
49	Liriodendron tulipifera (Tulip tree)	The Baynesfield Tulip Tree	Tree planted by Joseph Baynes in 1882 (143–144 years old), on the historic Baynesfield Estate.	Height: 34 m Stem size: 6.42 m Crown size: 25.3 m & 26.75 m	248	Baynesfield Estate, Richmond, KwaZulu-Natal 29°45′51.933″S 30°20′32.617″E	
50	Sequoia sempervirens (Californian redwood)	The Grootvadersbos Redwood Grove	Stand of tall Redwoods planted at Grootvadersbosch more than 80 years ago.	Height: 1) 57 m 2) 58 m 3) 66 m Stem size: 1) 3.47 m 2) 4.35 m 3) 3.2 m Crown size: 1) 11.2 m 2) 12.2 m 3) 12.2 m	238 (Tree 2); 232 (Tree 3); 200 (Tree 1)	Grootvadersbosch Nature Reserve, Western Cape 33°58′55.581″S 20°49′48.709″E	
51	Eucalyptus saligna (Sydney bluegum)	Herbert Baker Chapel Trees	Group of scenic trees standing next to a chapel designed by Sir Herbert Baker.	Height: 1) 33 m 2) 31 m 3) 42 m 4) 45 m Stem size: 1) 6.14 m 2) 4.81 m 3) 5.69 m 4) 5.96 m Crown size: 1) 26.8 m & 27.3 m 2) 22.5 m 3) 26.3 m 4) 27.2 m & 27.3 m	324 (Tree 2); 240 (Tree 1)	Porter Estate, Orpen Road, Western Cape 34°2′57.900″S 18°25′23.340″E	
52	Sequoia sempervirens (Californian redwood)	The Table Mountain Grove	Redwood trees planted in 1897 (128–129 years old), forming a landmark and recreation area for local residents, including tall Monterey pines at the fringe of this grove.	Height: 51 m Stem size: 3.44 m Crown size: 15.1 m	207	Part of block B18C Tokai plantation, Table Mountain National Park, Western Cape	
53	Acacia galpinii (Monkey thorn)	The Marico Tree	Tallest thorn tree measured in South Africa to date.	Height: 37 m Stem size: 5.69 m Crown size: 30 m& 32.14 m	277	Veeplaas, Skuinsdrift, Groot Marico, Northwest 25°23′25.620″S 26°22′42.327″E	
54	Ficus thonningii (Common wild fig)	Umtentweni Giant	Largest Common wild fig in South Africa.	Height: 21 m Stem size: 9.74 m Crown size: 34.1 m	288	Eden Park, Umtentweni, KwaZulu-Natal 30°42′34.910″S 30°28′5.511″E	
55	Eucalyptus camaldulensis (Red river gum)	The Infruitec Gum Tree	Large tree planted about 130 years ago, and now a landmark.	Height: 38.2 m Stem size: 9.7 m Crown size: 34 m & 40.1 m	409	Infruitec, Helshoogte Pass, Stellenbosch, Western Cape 33°55′23.082″S 18°52′11.581″E	
56	Eucalyptus camaldulensis (Red river gum)	Wilgenhof Grandfather	Large tree planted about 130 years ago, and now a landmark.	Height: 30.8 m Stem size: 8.5 m Crown size: 28.1 m & 28.4 m	269	Wilgenhof Residence, Victoria Street, Universiteitsoord, Stellenbosch, Western Cape 33°56′3.241″S 18°51′47.689″E	
57	Adansonia digitata (Baobab)	The King of Ga-Ratjeke	Newly discovered and one of the big 5 biggest indigenous trees in South Africa.	Height: 23.5 m Stem size: 24.15 m; 7.85 m & 2.14 m Crown size: 34.4 m & 30.8 m	383	Ga-Ratjeke Village, Limpopo 23°29′54.922″S 30°30′6.436″E	
58	Quercus robur (English oak)	Akkerdraai Oak Tree	Large Oak tree, possibly older than 175 years. Prominent landmark.	Height: 28 m Stem size: 6.1 m Crown size: 26 m	198	Akkerdraai Lodge, Annandale Road, Stellenbosch, Western Cape 33°59′48.508″S 18°49′46.516″E	
59	Eucalyptus grandis; Eucalyptus maculata (rose gum, spotted gum)	Gum Tree Corner	Group of exceptionally large gum trees.	Height: 58 m Stem size: 6.16 m Crown size: 41.2 m	521	KwaZulu-Natal National Botanical Garden, Pietermaritzburg, Kwa-Zulu Natal	
60	Sequoia sempervirens (Californian redwood)	Misty Grove	A stand of tall Sequoia trees planted about 80 years ago.	Height: 59 m Stem size: 3.4 m circ Crown size: 18 m	260	Woodbush Plantation, Haenertsburg, Limpopo 23°59.121′S 29°59.354′E	
61	Eucalyptus saligna (Saligna gum)	Saasveld Sentinels	Large Eucalyptus landmark trees at the scenic Saasveld campus.	Height: 1) 35 m 2) 39 m Stem size: 1) 5.49 m 2) 4.61 m Crown size: 1) 29.6 m 2) 34.2 m	276	Saasveld Campus of Nelson Mandela University, Western Cape 33°57′43.4160″S 22°32′06.6480″E	
62	Populus deltoides (Cottonwood tree)	The Parktown Tree	The largest Cottonwood tree measured locally, and a remnant of the semi-rural surroundings of Johannesburg which are now built up.	Height: 35 m Crown size: 28.07 m	238	5a 10_{th} Avenue, Parktown North, Gauteng 26°08′22.6″S 28°01′29.0″E	
63	Pinus pseudostrobus (False Weymouth pine)	The Three Matrons	The largest pine trees in Limpopo, planted in 1914 (111–112 years old).	Height: 1) 49.2 m 2) 50.3 m Stem size: 1) 4.93 m 2) 4.26 m Crown size: 1) 24.35 m 2) 16.7 m	304 (Tree 1); 239 (Tree 2)	Woodbush Forest Estate, Limpopo 23°50′35.6280″S 29°59′03.2640″E	
64	Ficus macrophylla (Moreton Bay fig)	The Zoo Giant	Large landmark tree near the entrance of the Pretoria Zoo.	Height: 27 m Stem size: 11.94 m Crown size: 39.7 m & 43.1 m	339	National Zoological Gardens, Pretoria, Gauteng 25°44′16.4000″S 28°11′20.6300″E	
65	Pinus taeda (Loblolly pine)	The Buffelsnek Pine	Tallest pine tree measured in South Africa.	Height: 60.1 m Crown size: 18 m	279	Buffelsnek State Forest, Knysna, Western Cape 33°54′28.5500″S 23°09′17.4000″E	
66	Ficus sycomorus (Sycamore fig)	The iLembe Tree	Very large tree in rural landscape, known as a local landmark from a century ago.	Height: 23 m Stem size: 11.49 m & 2.66 m & 12.12 m (23.55 m just below 1.4 m); Crown size: 39.24 m & 32.25 m	318	iLembe District Municipality, KwaZulu-Natal 28°52′50.7000″S 30°58′58.7280″E	
67	Cussonia spicata (Lowveld cabbage tree)	The Kurisa Forest Giant	An imposing giant forest tree.	Height: 35 m Stem size: 11.65 m Crown size: 22 m	316	Kurisa Moya Nature Lodge, Limpopo 23°28′51.4920″S 29°24′00.0480″E	
68	Eucalyptus camaldulensis (River red gum)	The Waterkloof Giant	Largest landmark tree of the eastern Pretoria suburbs. Remnant of a plantation taken over by suburban development.	Height: 34 m Stem size: 6.783 m Crown size: 33.72 m & 34.82 m	292	Waterkloof Primary School, Pretoria, Gauteng 25°46′40.7600″S 28°14′29.1700″E	
69	Adansonia digitata (Baobab)	Buffelsdrift baobab or Swartwater baobab	One of the five largest baobabs in the country.	Height: 28.4 m Stem size: 24.55 m Crown size: 29.11 m	336	Farm Swartwater, Limpopo 22°30′50.9400″S 28°07′58.7640″E	
70	Afrocarpus falcatus (Outeniqua yellowwood)	The Blouberg Big Trees	Among the tallest indigenous forest trees in the country.	Height: 41 m Stem size: 5.2 m Crown size: 31 m	293	Blouberg, Limpopo 23°05′08.8440″S 29°00′08.7120″E	
71	Ficus macrophylla (Moreton Bay fig)	The Kindergarten Giant	Large landmark tree at the UCT campus.	Height: 25 m Stem size: 16 m Crown size: 41 m	361	University of Cape Town, Cape Town, Western Cape 33°57′31.1500″S 18°27′28.5800″E	
72	Ficus thoningii (Common wild fig)	The Vygekraal Trees	A scenic grove of large trees growing on the walls of a cattle kraal built in the late nineteenth century	Height: 23 m Stem size: 5.02 m Crown size: 2.,6 m	155	The farm Vygekraal, Pretoria, Gauteng	
73	Eucalyptus grandis(rose gume)	The Satico Giants	Stand of second-tallest trees in the country, planted in 1938 (87–88 years old)	Height: 72.3 m Stem size: 3.29 m Crown size: 16.5 m	301	Satico Plantation, near Louw's Creek, Mpumalanga	
74	Eucalyptus globulus (blue gum)	Exceptionally large gum tree		Height: 72.3 m Stem size: 3.29 m Crown size: 16.5 m		The farm Radyn near Villliersdorp, Western Cape	
75	Ficus macrophylla (Moreton Bay fig)	The Fernwood Trees	Landmark trees of the same vintage as the Arderne Garden trees (about 160 years old)	Height: 27.5 m Stem size: 3.29 m Crown size: 45.5 m	322	Fernwood Avenue, Newlands, Cape Town, Western Cape	
76	Cinnamomum camphora (camphor tree)	The Hohenhort Grove	Grove of camphor trees of about 250 years old growing behind cellars on a historic farmyard.	Height: 24 m Stem size: 9.48 m Crown size: 18.9 m	151	Cellar Hohenort Hotel, Brommesvlei Road, Constantia, Cape Town, Western Cape	
77	Eucalyptus globulus (blue red gum)	The Welbedacht Tree	Landmark tree on private nature reserve.	Height: 37.5 m Crown size: 29.8 m	330	Welbedacht Reserve, Tulbagh, Western Cape	
78	Sequoia sempervirens (Californian redwood)	Hogsback Redwood Giants	Grove of large redwood trees planted almost a century ago.	Height: 55 m Crown size: 13.2 m	309	Hogsback, Eastern Cape	
79	Quercus suber (cork oak)	Ina Paarman Oak	Tree on the property of Mrs Ina Paarman of food condiments fame, planted in the mid-19th century.	Height: 22.7 m Crown size: 32.6 m	157	Constantia Main Road, Constantia, Western Cape	
80	Eucalyptus globulus (blue gum)	Houwhoek Inn Tree	Large tree planted in the mid-19th century at the oldest hotel in the country. (1850)	Height: 27 m Crown size: 26.8 m	250	Off the N2 road, Grabouw, Western Cape	
81	Eucalyptus saligna (saligna gum)	Merensky Lane	Scenic lane of trees planted by Hans Merensky on the Westfalia Estate in the 1930s.	Height: 69 m Crown size: 21.5 m	404	Westfalia Estate, Modjadjiskloof, Limpopo	
82	Eucalyptus diversicolor (karri gum)	Boschendal Lane	Lane of exceptionally large trees planted more than two centuries ago.	Height: 50.4 m Crown size: 33.6 m	483	Boschendal Estate, Helshoogte Road, Western Cape	
83	Sequoia sempervirens (Californian redwood)	The Harkerville Giants	Tall and scenic redwoods planted in 1925 (100–101 years ago).	Height: 48 m		Harkerville State Forest, Garden Route National Park, Western Cape	
84	Ficus elastica (rubber tree)	The Company's Garden Giant	Large tree forming a focal point to the entry to the Company's Gardens.	Height: 36.7 m		Company's Garden, Cape Town, Western Cape	
85	Ficus sur (broom cluster fig)	The Sabie River Giant	Very large tree along the Sabie River.	Height: 34.5 m		Sabie Park Nature Reserve, Limpopo	
86	Ficus thonningii (common wild fig)	The Whisper Tree or Fluisterboom	Very large tree in the grounds of a guesthouse. Estimated to be more than 200 years old.	Height: 17 m		Voëlroepersfontein Guest House, Albertinia, Western Cape 34°12′21.7″S 21°34′56.5″E	
87	Eucalyptus viminalis (manna gum tree)	The Frankfort Big Trees	Two very large landmark trees on a farm near the Vaal Dam.	Height: 33.0 m		The farm Brakwal, Grootdam-Alma 1440, Frankfort, Free State	
88	Eucalyptis saligna	The Dwarsrivierkloof Lane	A lane of very large landmark trees on a farm, planted more than 150 years ago.	Height: 60.4 m		The farm Dwarsrivierkloof, Winelands District Municipality, Western Cape	
89	Adansonia digitata (baobab)	The Honnet Giant	One of the five biggest baobab in South Africa.	Height: 16 m		Honnet Nature Reserve, Tshipise, Limpopo	
90	Corymbia ficifolia (red flowering gum)	The Wolfskloof Tree	Very large landmark tree on a farm; 170 years old.	Height: 34.5 m		Wolfkloof Farm, Robertson District, Western Cape	
91	Ficus anulata (Anulata fig)	The Durban Big Tree	Very large and rare landmark tree in botanical garden.	Height: 33 m		Durban Botanic Gardens, Kwa-Zulu Natal	
92	Ficus benghalensis (Banyan tree)	The Durban Banyan Tree	Very large landmark tree in botanical garden.	Height: 31 m		Durban Botanic Gardens, Kwa-Zulu Natal	
93	Eucalyptus camaldulensis (River red gum)	The Plaisir de Merle Trees	Grove of very large trees.	Height: 37.2 m		Plaisir de Merle, Simondium, Western Cape	

== See also ==
- Champion Tree
- List of individual trees
- List of protected areas of South Africa
