= Atwell Mill Grove =

Giant sequoia grove in Tulare County, California, United States

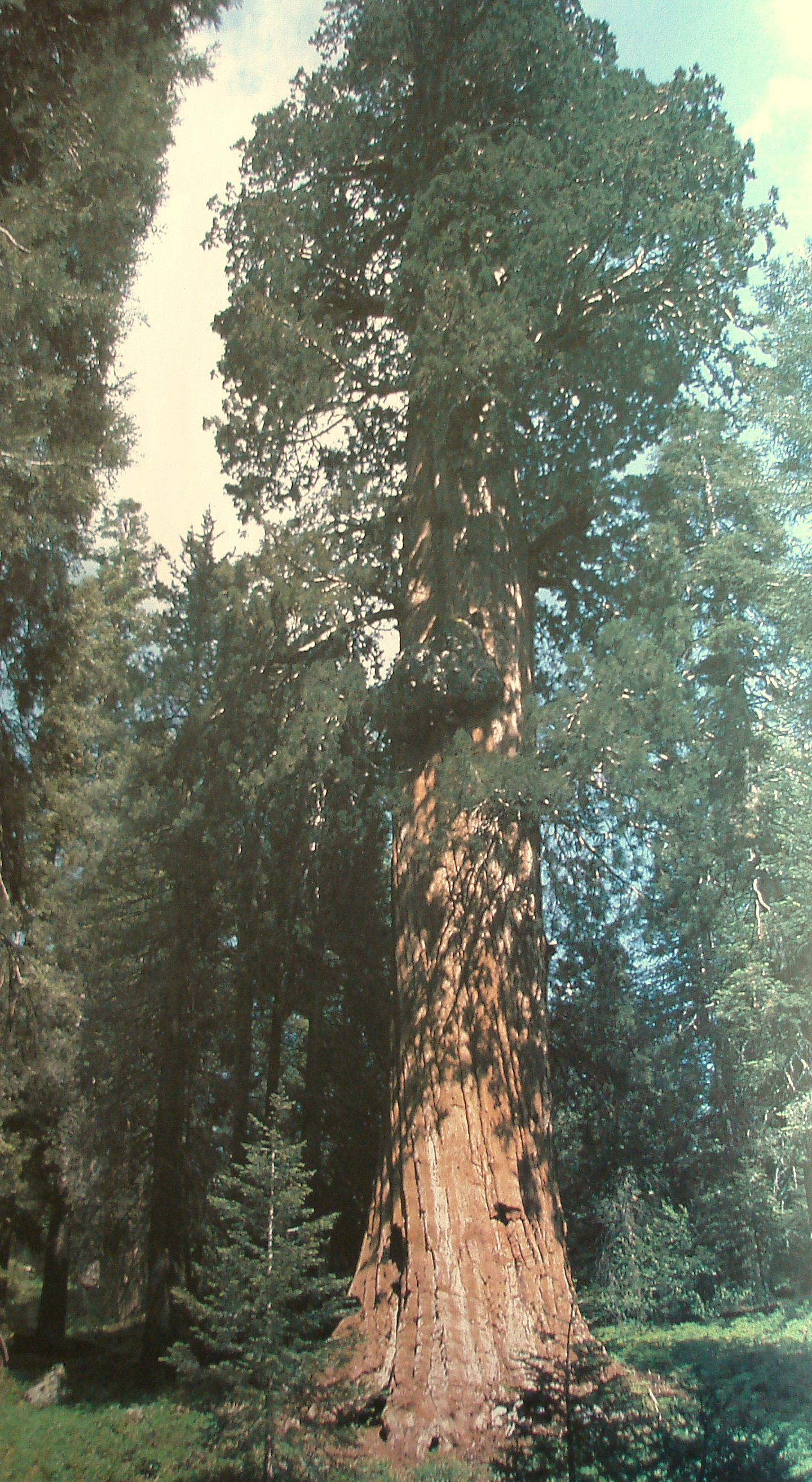
- The "AD Tree" in Atwell Mill Grove

- Location within California
- Interactive map of Atwell Mill Grove

Geography
- Location: Tulare County, California, United States
- Coordinates: 36°27′57″N 118°40′50″W
- Elevation: 6,900 ft (2,100 m)

Ecology
- Dominant tree species: Sequoiadendron giganteum

Atwell Mill Grove is a giant sequoia grove in the east fork of the Kaweah watershed area in California. Can be accessed via the Mineral King Road which branches off California State Route 198 below the south entrance to Sequoia National Park.

The grove is located about 1.5 miles (2.4 km) west of the community of Silver City and 19 miles (31 km) from the junction of highway 198. The road into this section of the park is narrow and difficult. Atwell Mill Campground, on East Fork of the Kaweah River, is located in part of the grove that was logged before the trees were protected. Atwell Mill was at one time a lumber mill that processed logs from the grove.

== Noteworthy trees ==
Some of the trees found in the grove that are worthy of special note are:

- Diamond: This tree is on a steep slope, and is taller than average at almost 290 feet. It's the largest tree of the grove.
- Above Diamond: This tree is just above the Diamond Tree, (hence the name "AD") the main trunk is thick.
- Dean Tree: 32,333 cubic feet (915 cubic meters) in volume, gives this tree a rank inside the top 30 giant sequoias in the world.
- Arm Tree: The largest known limb of any tree in the world belongs to this tree at around 12 feet in diameter. Also known as the "Big Limb Tree".
- Tunnel Tree: Has a basal diameter (not girth) of fifty-seven feet (seventeen meters) with an internal cavity large enough to hold three Volkswagen Bugs.

== See also ==
- List of giant sequoia groves
- List of superlative trees
- Mineral King
- Silver City, California
