= Sagole Baobab =

Largest indigenous tree of South Africa in Limpopo

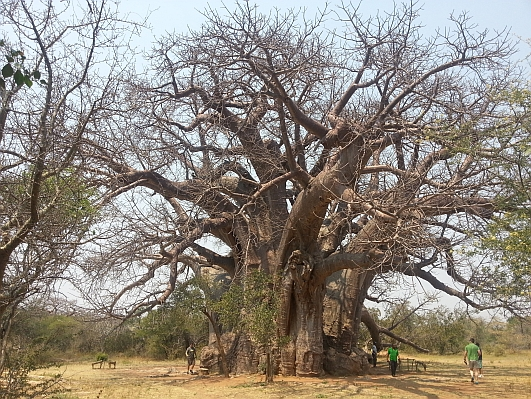
- The Big Tree of Sagole in Limpopo, South Africa
- Interactive map of Sagole Baobab
- Native name: Muri kunguluwa (Venda)
- Species: Adansonia digitata
- Location: Sagole
- Coordinates: 22°29.994′S 30°37.990′E
- Height: 20.5 m (67 ft)
- Diameter: 10.8 m (35 ft)

The Sagole Baobab (also Sagole Big Tree, Venda: Muri kunguluwa, lit. 'tree that roars', or Muvhuyu wa Makhadzi) is a Champion Tree and the largest baobab tree (Adansonia digitata) in South Africa. It is located east from Tshipise, in Vendaland, Limpopo Province and has a trunk diameter of 10.8 metres (35 ft), circumference of 32.89 metres (107.9 ft). It would take 18–20 people to encircle the tree with open hands.

To view the tree, there is an entrance fee of R 50 per adult and R 30 per child.

This became the stoutest tree in South Africa after two other large baobabs, the Glencoe and Sunland Baobabs, collapsed in 2009 and 2016 respectively. The Sagole Baobab has the largest size and retains the appearance of a single tree. It is 20.5 metres (67 ft) high with a crown diameter of 38.2 metres (125 ft).

A breeding colony of mottled spinetails (Telacanthura ussheri) are resident in the tree.

== See also ==
- List of individual trees
- List of Champion Trees (South Africa)
