= Cheewhat Giant =

Largest known tree in Canada

- Interactive map of Cheewhat Giant
- Species: Western redcedar (Thuja plicata)
- Location: Vancouver Island; British Columbia, Canada
- Coordinates: 48°41′48″N 124°44′37″W
- Height: 55.5 m (182 ft)
- Diameter: 6.1 m (20 ft)
- Volume of trunk: 449 m^{3} (15,900 ft^{3})

Cheewhat Giant, also known as the Cheewhat Lake Cedar, is a large western red cedar (Thuja plicata) tree located within Pacific Rim National Park Reserve on Vancouver Island in British Columbia, Canada. It is the largest living Western redcedar, the largest known tree in Canada and one of the largest in the world.

== History ==
The tree was discovered in 1972 within the already established Pacific Rim National Park Reserve. It was named after nearby Cheewhat Lake. With the death of the (17,650 ft^{3} (500 m^{3})) Quinault Lake Cedar in 2016, the Cheewhat Lake tree became the world's largest living Western redcedar.

== See also ==
- Red Creek Fir - largest Douglas-fir in the world, also located on Vancouver Island
- Duncan Cedar - largest Western redcedar in the United States, located on the Olympic Peninsula
- List of individual trees
- List of superlative trees
