= Above Diamond =

Large giant sequoia tree in Sequoia National Park, California

Coordinates: 36°27′53″N 118°41′36″W

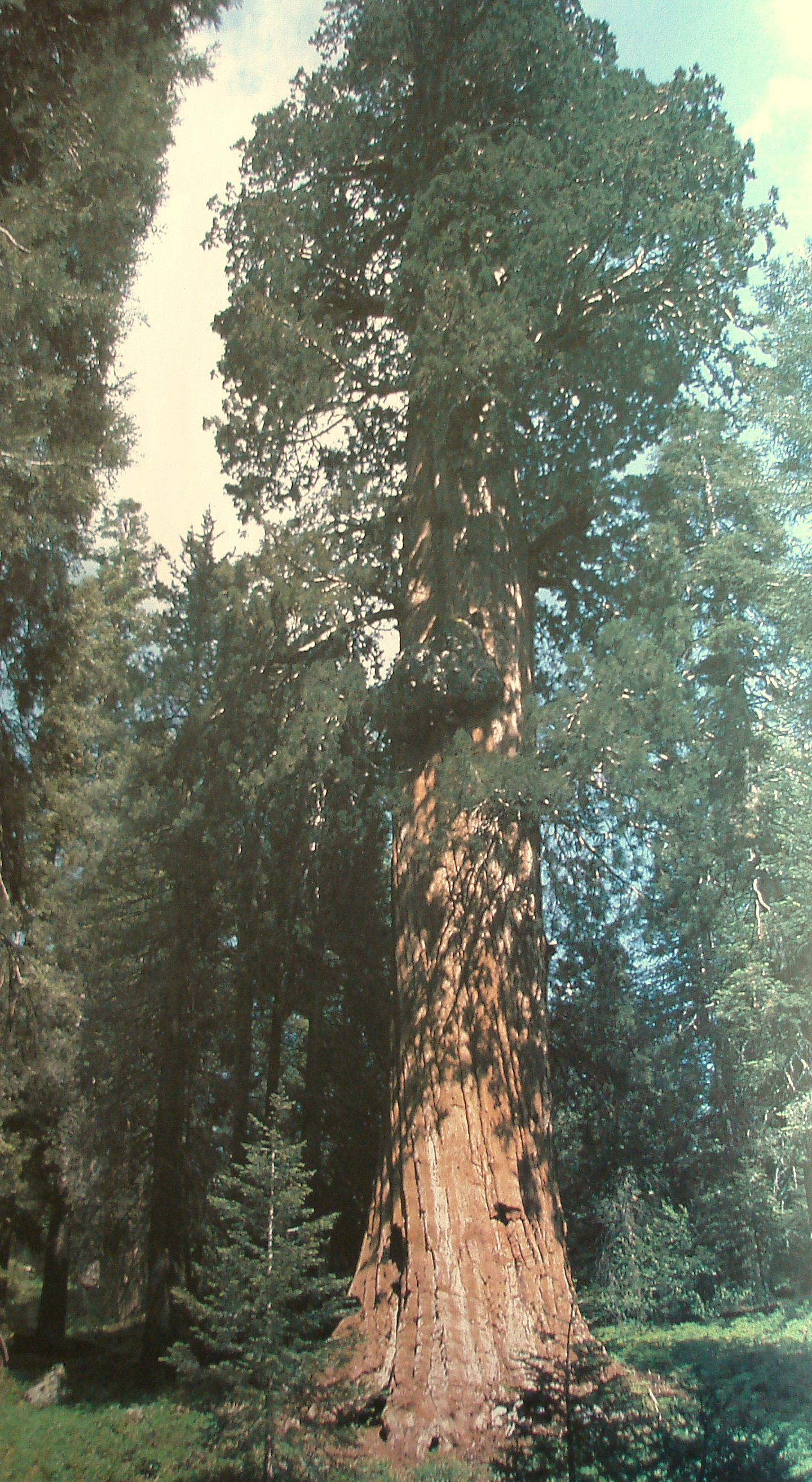
Above Diamond, the second largest tree of Atwell Mill Grove

Above Diamond, also known by the abbreviation AD, is a giant sequoia located within the Atwell Mill Grove of Sequoia National Park, California. Naturalists Dennis Coggins, Wendell D. Flint, and Michael M. Law named the tree "Above Diamond" after Diamond, a giant sequoia located just downhill from the tree. It is the second largest tree in Atwell Mill Grove, the 24th largest giant sequoia in the world, and could be considered the 23rd largest depending on how badly Ishi Giant atrophied during the Rough Fire in 2015.

== Description ==
Above Diamond is located 0.65 mi (1.05 km) north-northwest of Mineral King Road and 0.3 mi (0.48 km) northeast of Diamond, requiring a fair bit of uphill cross-country hiking to reach either tree.

== Dimensions ==
| Height above base | 242.4 ft | 73.9 m |
| Circumference at ground | 99 ft | 30.2 m |
| Estimated bole volume | 34,706 cu ft | 983 m^{3} |

== See also ==
- List of largest giant sequoias
- List of individual trees
