= Glencoe Baobab =

Baobab tree in South Africa

- Species: Adansonia digitata
- Location: Hoedspruit, Limpopo
- Coordinates: 24°22′26.2″S 30°51′27.5″E
- Height: 17 m (56 ft)
- Diameter: 15.90 m (52.2 ft)

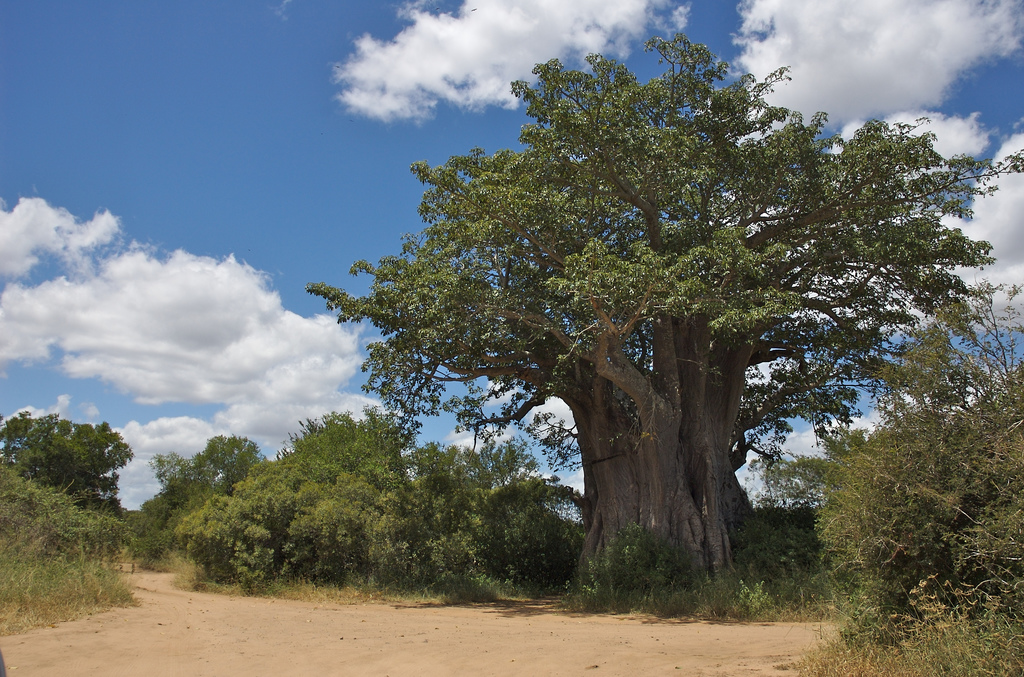
Baobab tree in Kruger National Park, South Africa is of the same species (Adansonia digitata) as the Glencoe Baobab

Glencoe Baobab is the stoutest and second largest baobab (Adansonia digitata L.) after the Sagole Baobab in South Africa. It is possibly the stoutest tree in the world. The Champion Tree is located in Glencoe Farm, near Hoedspruit, Limpopo and had a trunk diameter of 15.9 m (52 ft).

The tree divides into several trunks close to the ground. The main trunk had lowered into the ground a long time ago. In November 2009 the tree split in two parts, opening up an enormous hollow.

The diameter of the tree before the split was 15.9 m (52 ft) with a circumference of 47 m (154 ft). The height is 17 m (56 ft), and the spread of crown is 37.05 m (121.6 ft).

The dates "1893" and "1896" are carved on the tree's stem. Radiocarbon dating performed in 2013 suggested an age of 1,835 years.

== See also ==
- List of individual trees
- List of Champion Trees (South Africa)
- List of superlative trees
