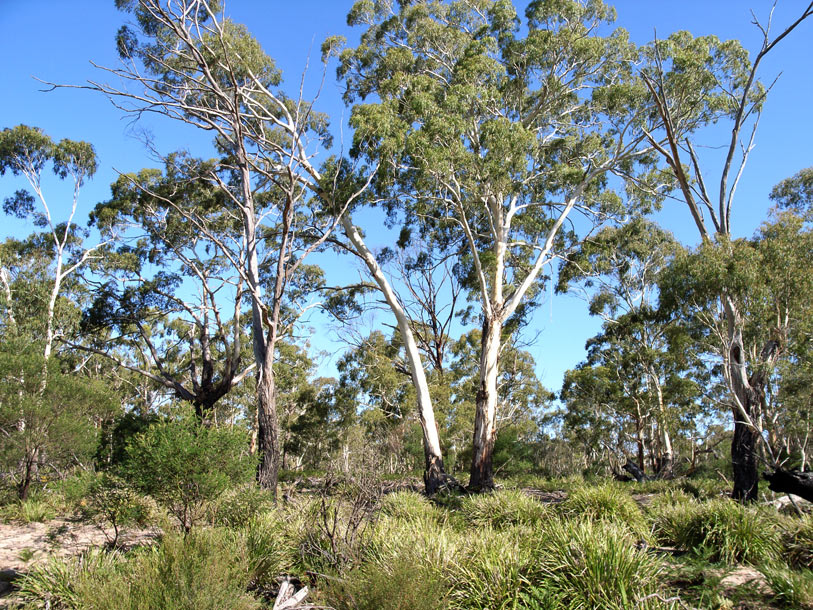
- Eucalyptus viminalis near the Shoalhaven River

Conservation status
- Near Threatened (IUCN 3.1)

Scientific classification
- Kingdom: Plantae
- Clade: Tracheophytes
- Clade: Angiosperms
- Clade: Eudicots
- Clade: Rosids
- Order: Myrtales
- Family: Myrtaceae
- Genus: Eucalyptus
- Species: E. viminalis

Binomial name
- Eucalyptus viminalis Labill.
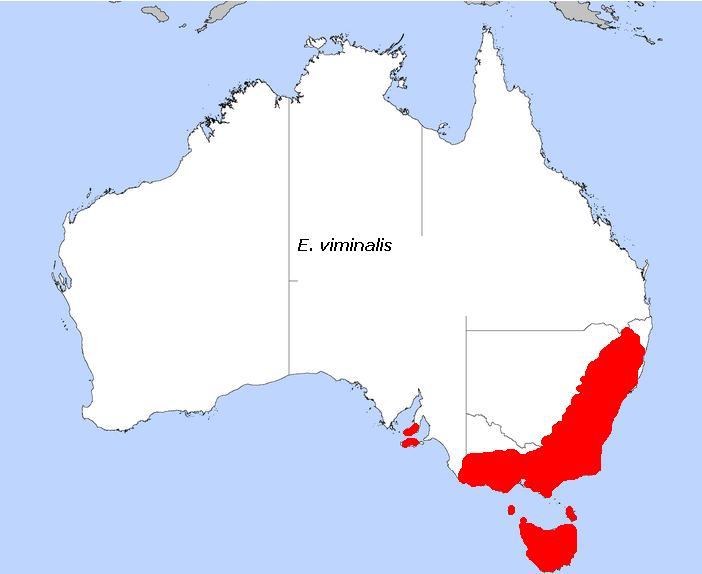
- E. viminalis, field distribution

= Eucalyptus viminalis =

Manna gum

Species of eucalyptus

Eucalyptus viminalis, commonly known as the manna gum, white gum or ribbon gum, is a species of small to very tall tree that is endemic to south-eastern Australia. It has smooth bark, sometimes with rough bark near the base, lance-shaped to curved adult leaves, flower buds in groups of three or seven, white flowers and cup-shaped or hemispherical fruit.

== Description ==
Eucalyptus viminalis is a tree that typically grows to a height of 50 m (160 ft), sometimes to 90 m (300 ft), and forms a lignotuber. It has smooth, often powdery, white to pale brown bark that is shed in long ribbons, sometimes hanging on the upper branches, and sometimes with rough, fibrous bark on the lower trunk. Young plants and coppice regrowth have sessile, lance-shaped to curved or oblong leaves 25–150 mm (0.98–5.91 in) long, 5–35 mm (0.20–1.38 in) wide and arranged in opposite pairs. Adult leaves are arranged alternately, the same shade of green on both sides, lance-shaped to curved, 85–232 mm (3.3–9.1 in) long and 8–30 mm (0.31–1.18 in) wide, tapering to a petiole 10–25 mm (0.39–0.98 in) long. The flower buds are arranged in groups of three or seven on an unbranched peduncle 4–10 mm (0.16–0.39 in) long, the individual buds sessile or on pedicels up to 5 mm (0.20 in) long. Mature buds are oval to spindle-shaped, 5–9 mm (0.20–0.35 in) long and 3–6 mm (0.12–0.24 in) wide with a conical, rounded or beaked operculum. Flowering occurs from December to May and the flowers are white. The fruit is a woody, cup-shaped or hemispherical capsule 3–8 mm (0.12–0.31 in) long and 5–9 mm (0.20–0.35 in) wide with the valves prominently protruding.

== Taxonomy and naming ==
Eucalyptus viminalis was first formally described in 1806 by Jacques Labillardière in his book Novae Hollandiae Plantarum Specimen. The specific epithet (viminalis) is a Latin word meaning "bearing shoots or ribbons for wicker work.

The following subspecies are accepted by the Australian Plant Census:

- Eucalyptus viminalis subsp. cygnetensis Boomsma is a spreading tree to 20 m (66 ft) with rough bark on the lower half of the trunk, and flower buds usually in groups of seven;
- Eucalyptus viminalis subsp. hentyensis Brooker & Slee has little rough bark, coarse, broad juvenile leaves and flower buds in groups of three or seven;
- Eucalyptus viminalis subsp. pryoriana (L.A.S.Johnson) Brooker & Slee, previously known as Eucalyptus pryoriana L.A.S.Johnson is a spreading tree to 15 m (49 ft) tall, with rough bark and flower buds in groups of three;
- Eucalyptus viminalis subsp. siliceana Rule is a shady tree to 15 m (49 ft) tall with rough bark on the trunk, flower buds in groups of three and seven, fruit 4–6 mm (0.16–0.24 in) wide and glaucous tip on the seedlings; According to VicFlora, (the website of The Royal Botanical Gardens of Victoria), this subspecies is endangered.
- Eucalyptus viminalis Labill. subsp. viminalis is most easily distinguished by it many pairs of sessile, lance-shaped, green juvenile leaves that are arranged in opposite pairs. It is also usually smooth-barked and has flower buds mostly in groups of three.

According to the early Australian ethnographer Alfred William Howitt, the name wurundjeri, in his transcription urunjeri, refers to E. viminalis which is common along Birrarung. Some modern reports of Wurundjeri traditional lore state that their ethnonym combines a word, wurun, meaning manna gum and djeri, a species of grub found in the tree, and take the word therefore to mean "Witchetty Grub People".

Some common names included white gum or swamp gum of Tasmania, manna gum, grey gum, blue gum, and drooping gum.

== Distribution and habitat ==
Subspecies cygnetensis, commonly known as the rough-barked manna gum, grows in the higher rainfall areas of South Australia, including Kangaroo Island and the southern Mount Lofty Ranges and as far east as the Grampians in Victoria. Subspecies hentyensis, commonly known as the western Tasmanian sand gum, grows in sandy soil on the west coast of Tasmania, north from Strahan. Subspecies pryoriana, commonly known as the Gippsland manna gum, grows in sandy, coastal soil from the Bellarine Peninsula to Lake Tyers in the Gippsland Lakes in Victoria. Subspecies siliceana is known only from the Wail State Forest in the Wimmera region of Victoria, where it grows in deep sand. Subspecies viminalis is widely distributed and abundant in the well-watered areas of south-eastern Australia, from the coast and ranges of New South Wales, the southern half of Victoria, the Eyre Peninsula and Kangaroo Island in south-eastern South Australia. It also occurs in Tasmania where some specimens are almost 90 m (300 ft) tall.

== Uses ==
Indigenous Australians used the wood of the tree to make shields and wooden bowls.

The tree produces a sweet, white, crumbly manna from its bark. Valued by Aboriginal people, this sugary substance forms when sap exudes and dries in the hot summer air, eventually falling to the ground in small irregular lumps. There is debate over the cause of the sap leakage, with some attributing it to cicada borings and others to the activity of a gall-making insect.

== Gallery ==
Features of the Manna gum (Eucalyptus viminalis)
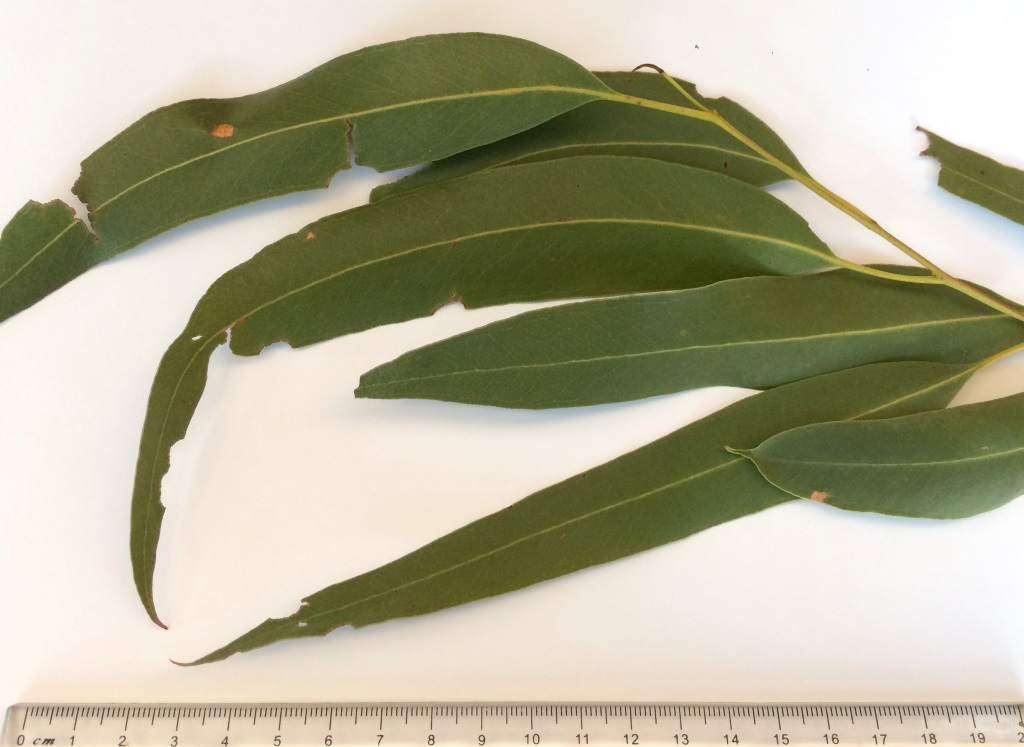
Adult leaves

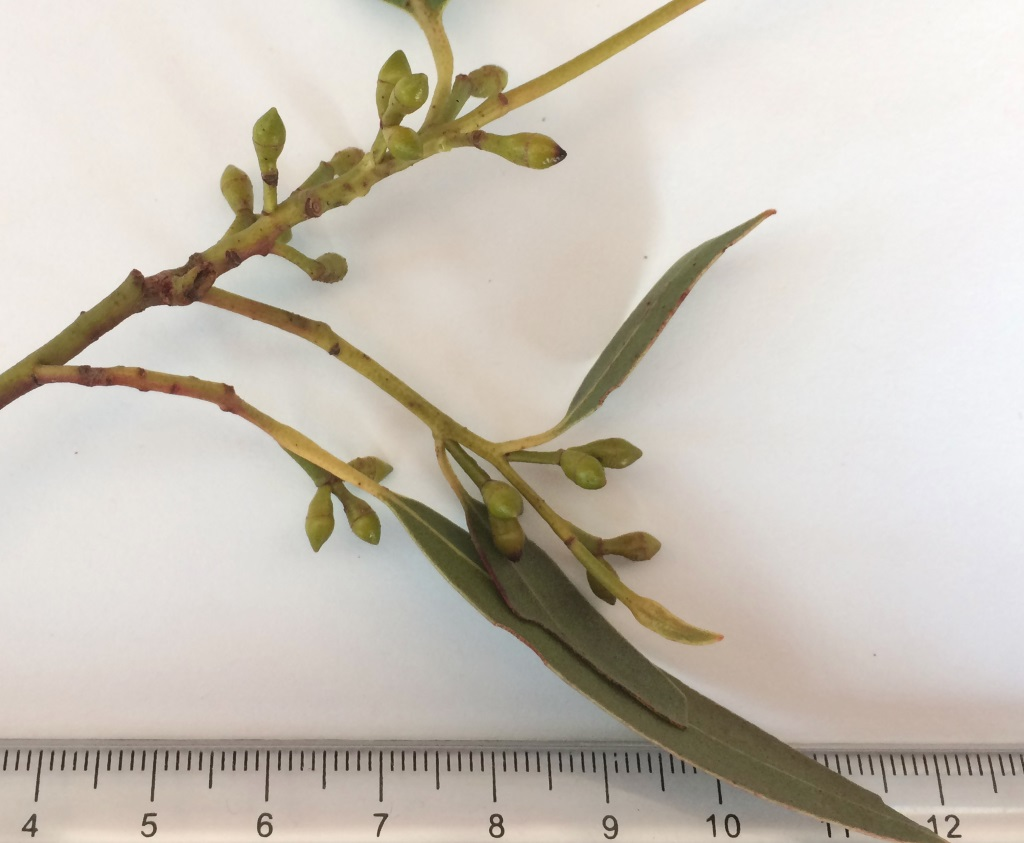
Buds

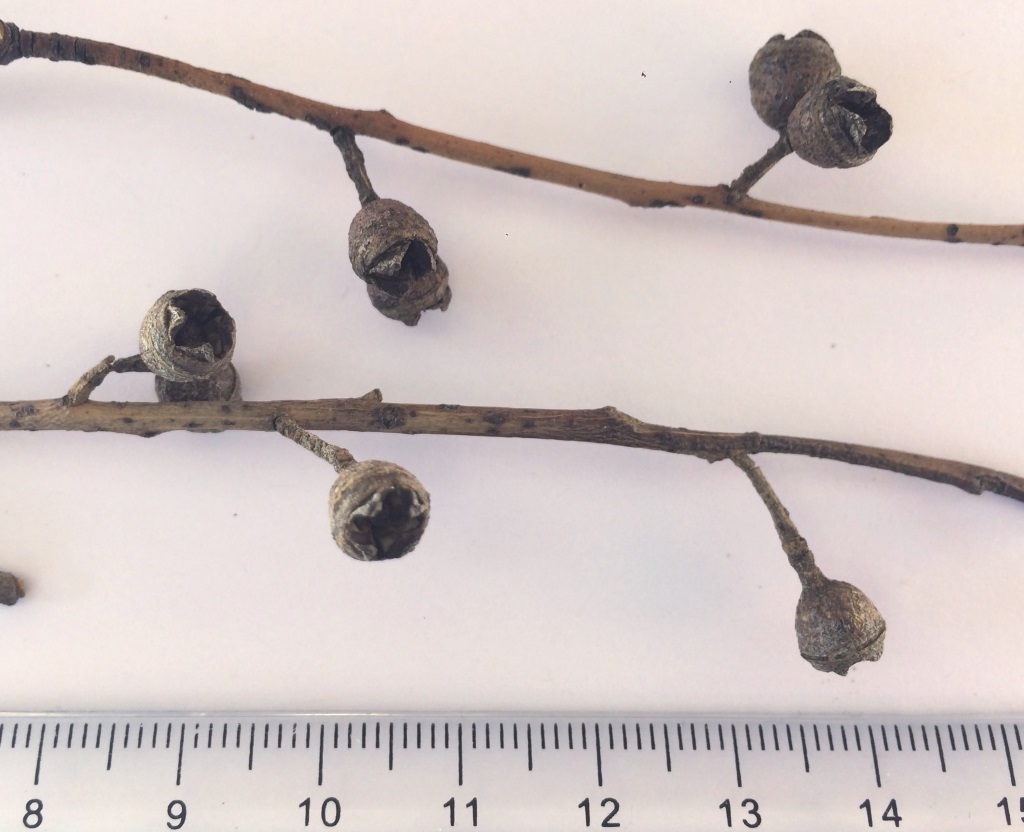
Fruit

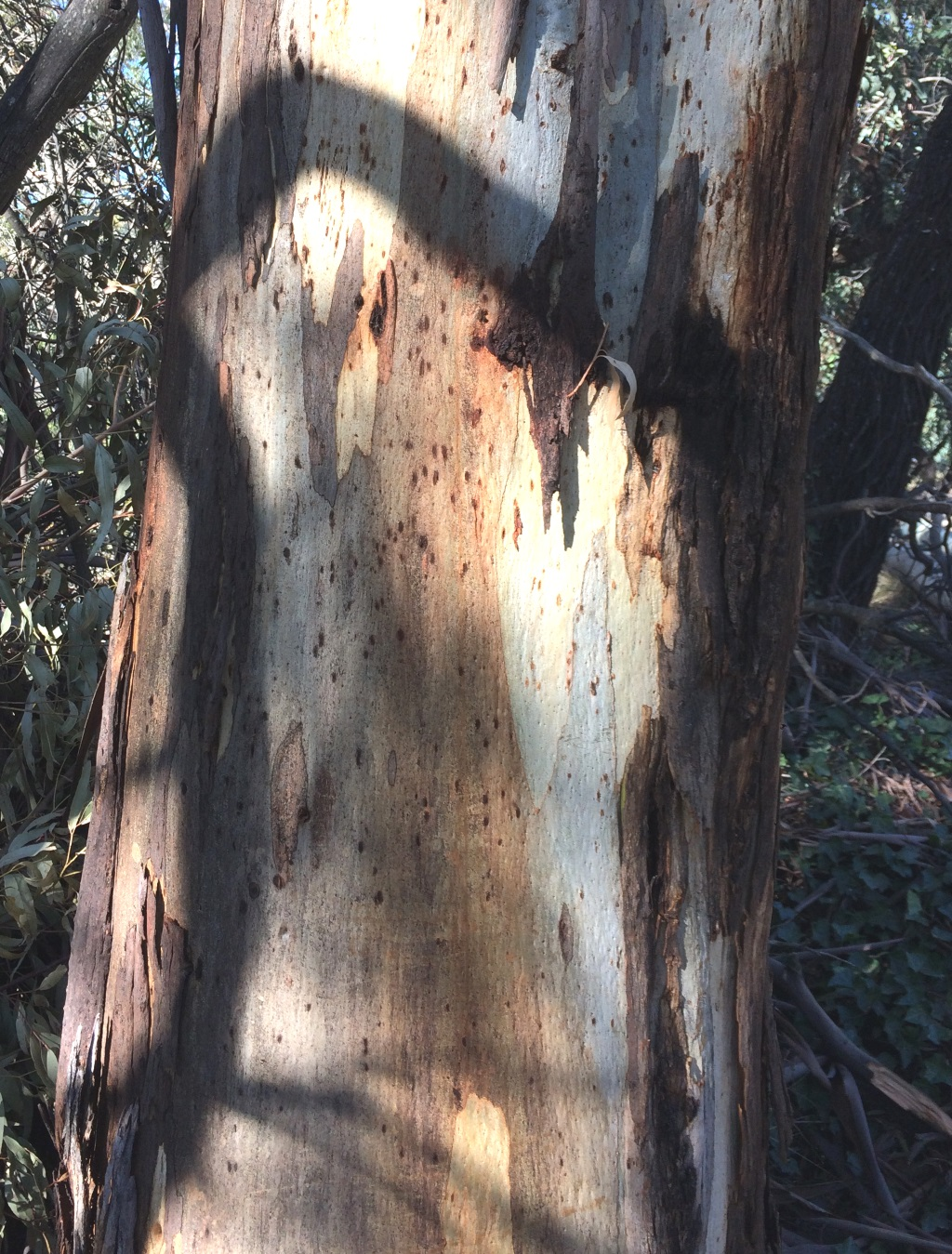
Trunk bark

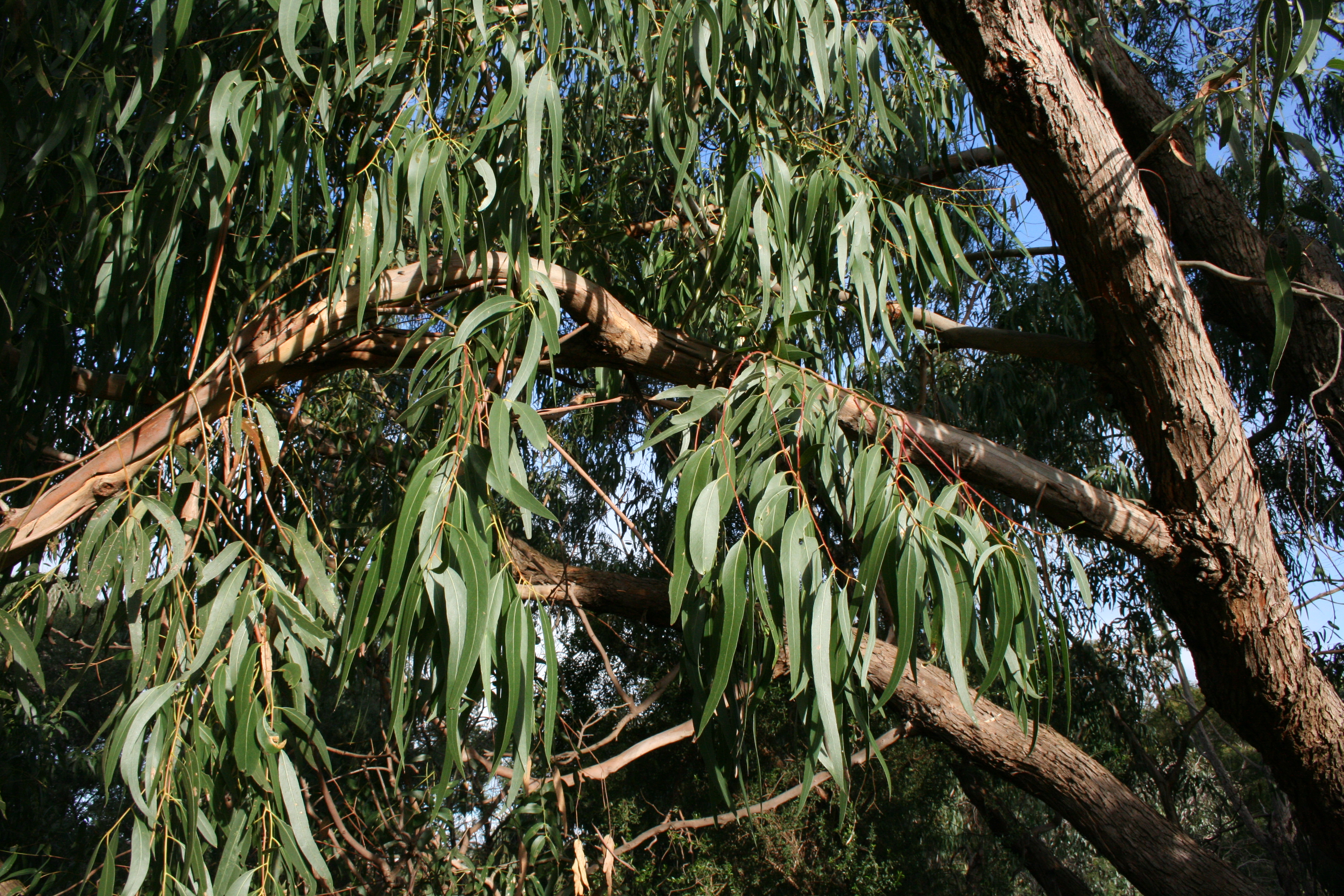
Eucalyptus viminalis subsp. pryoriana in Bradshaw Bushland Reserve

== See also ==
- List of Eucalyptus species
- List of superlative trees
