= Champion Tree =

Trees of special significance

Champion Tree is a designation afforded to selected trees that are special or superlative because of their height, size, or significance. A number of countries including the UK, New Zealand, the United States, South Africa, and Canada support such designation schemes based on standardised criteria. A database of over 80,000 such designated trees in the UK, detailed by genus, species, height, girth, site, county and country is maintained at the Tree Register. This UK database dates back to 1620 and in 2022 completed the recording of its 250,000th tree.

The designations in the US are recorded in the National Register of Champion Trees.

South Africa has 93 designated Champion Trees, administered by the Department of Forestry, Fisheries and the Environment.

== See also ==
- List of individual trees
