= Sunland Baobab =

Baobab tree in South Africa

- Location within South Africa
- Species: Baobab (Adansonia digitata)
- Coordinates: 23°37′16″S 30°11′53″E
- Height: 22 m (72 ft)
- Diameter: 10.64 m (34.9 ft)
- Date seeded: 950AD ± 75

Sunland Baobab (also Platland Baobab, Mooketsi Baobab, Tree Bar, Big Baobab or Pub Tree) is a well-known enormous baobab (Adansonia digitata) in South Africa. The tree is located on Sunland Farm (Platland Farm), near Modjadjiskloof (previously known as Duiwelskloof), Limpopo Province. In one study the tree was carbon-dated and found to be an estimated 1,060 years old, plus or minus 75 years. Results of other studies have however suggested much higher ages. The tree used to bloom profusely in spring, at some stage providing a refuge to two pairs of owls, and other bird species. Most of the tree died in 2016 and 2017.

== Structure ==
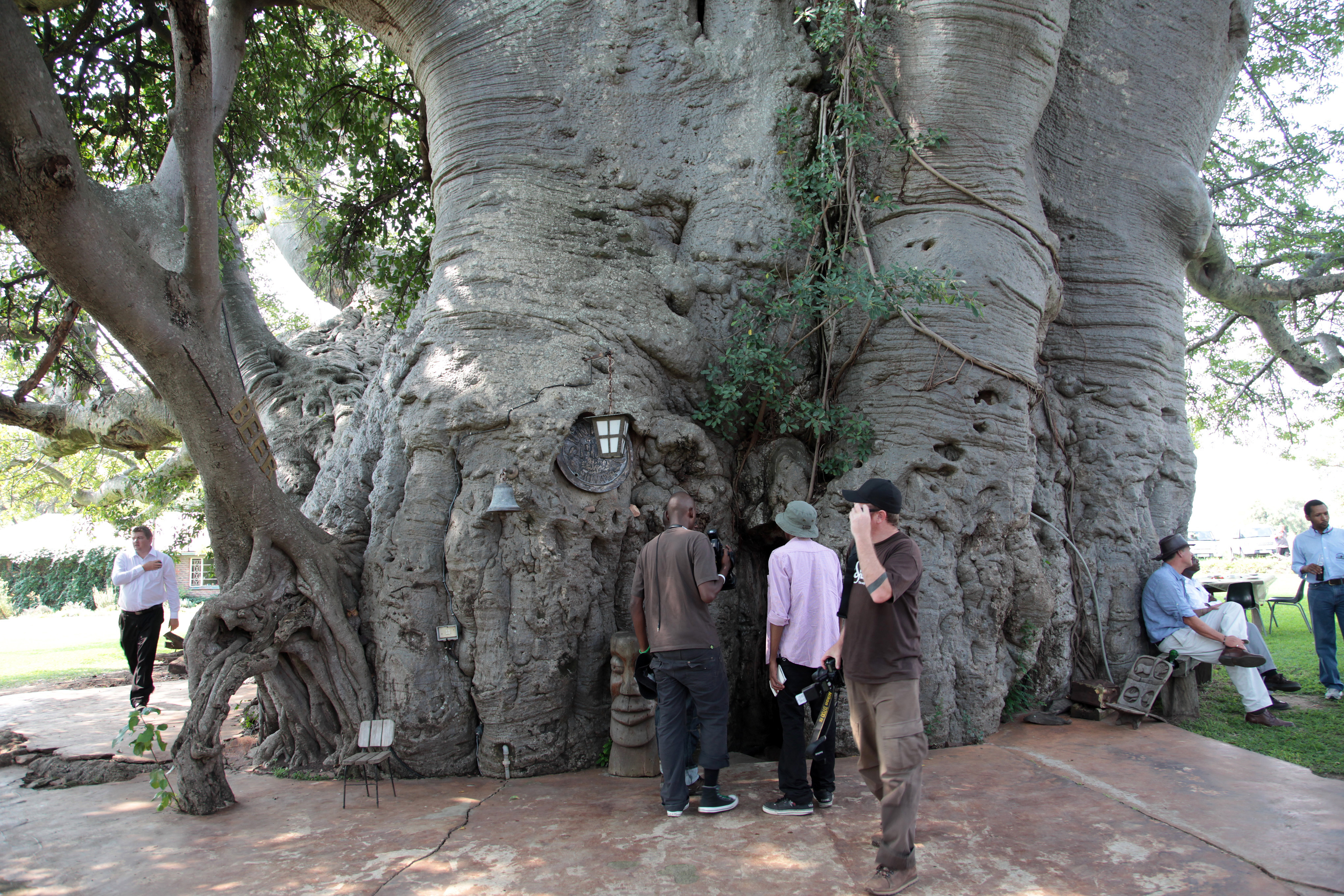
Base of tree

Before starting to collapse, it was 22 metres high and 47 metres in circumference. The trunk diameter was 10.64 metres (the Glencoe Baobab up until its 2009 split was larger, and the Árbol del Tule is also larger with a diameter of 14.05 m), and the crown diameter was 30.2 metres. The trunk consists of two connected sections, each with its own enormous hollow, and these are connected by a narrow passage. One third of the baobab tree collapsed in August 2016. This was ascribed to age and the natural hollowing of the trunk with time. The property owners intend to leave the fallen trunk sections in place as they fall, allowing natural processes to reshape and assimilate the features.

== History ==
When the internal hollows were cleared of compost in 1993, evidence of Bushmen and Voortrekker visitors was found. Carbon investigations inside the hollows testified to fires in 1650 AD, 1750–1780, 1900, 1955 and 1990.

== Tourist attraction ==
The Sunland Big Baobab became a popular tourist attraction after 1993 when the owners of Sunland farm established a bar and wine cellar in its hollow trunk. The hollow centre of the tree was cleared of a substantial compost layer to uncover the floor at about a meter below the present ground level. A door was placed in a squared off natural vent in the trunk, and a railway sleeper pub was constructed inside, complete with draft beer, seats and a music system. 60 people once attended a party inside this tree bar. A wine cellar was installed in the second hollow, which remains at a constant 22 °C temperature thanks to the tree's natural vents.

The bar was destroyed in 2017 when the tree split, the second major break in 2 years. According to a study published in 2018, not only the Sunland Baobab, but "the majority of the oldest and largest African baobabs [have died] over the past 12 years".

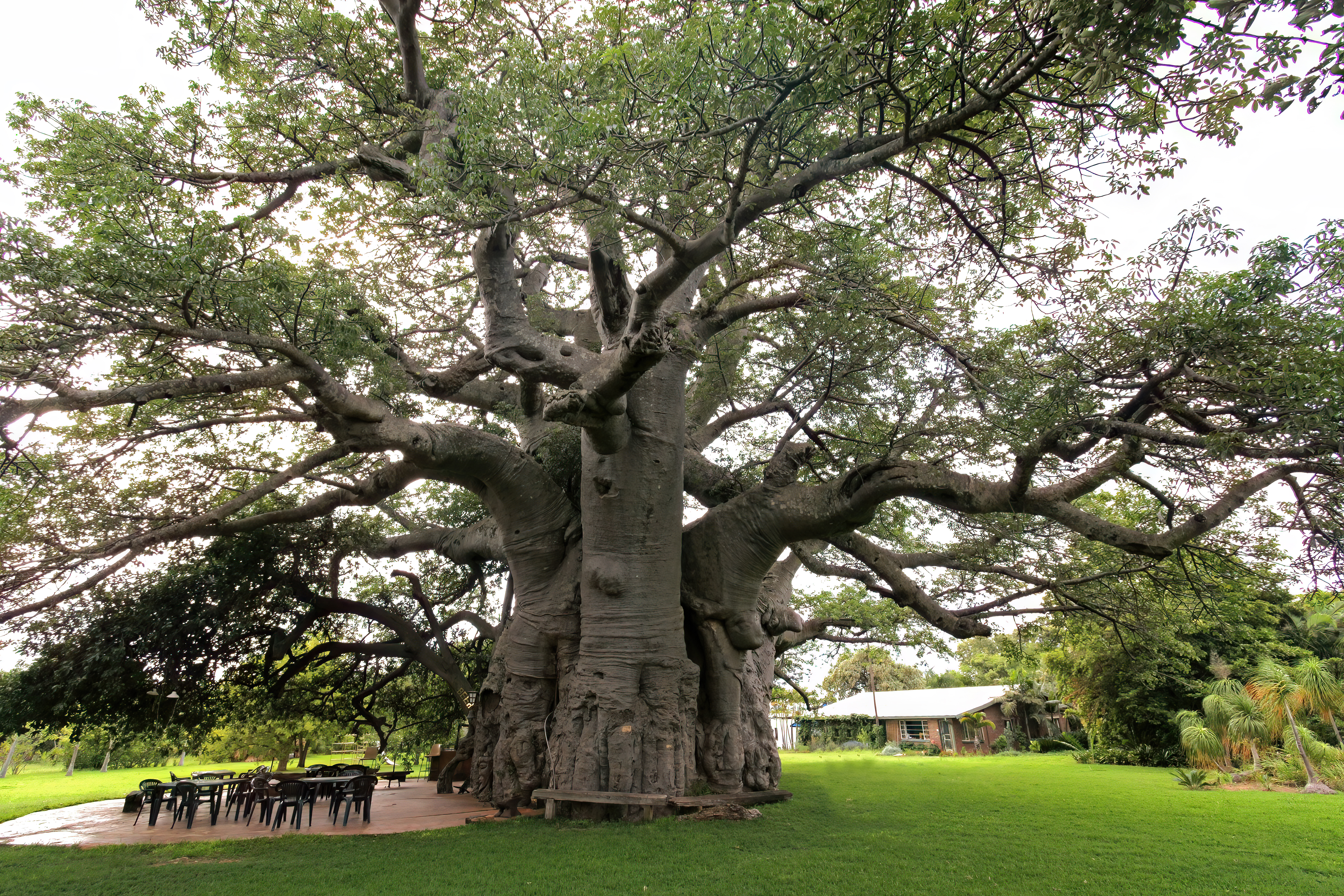

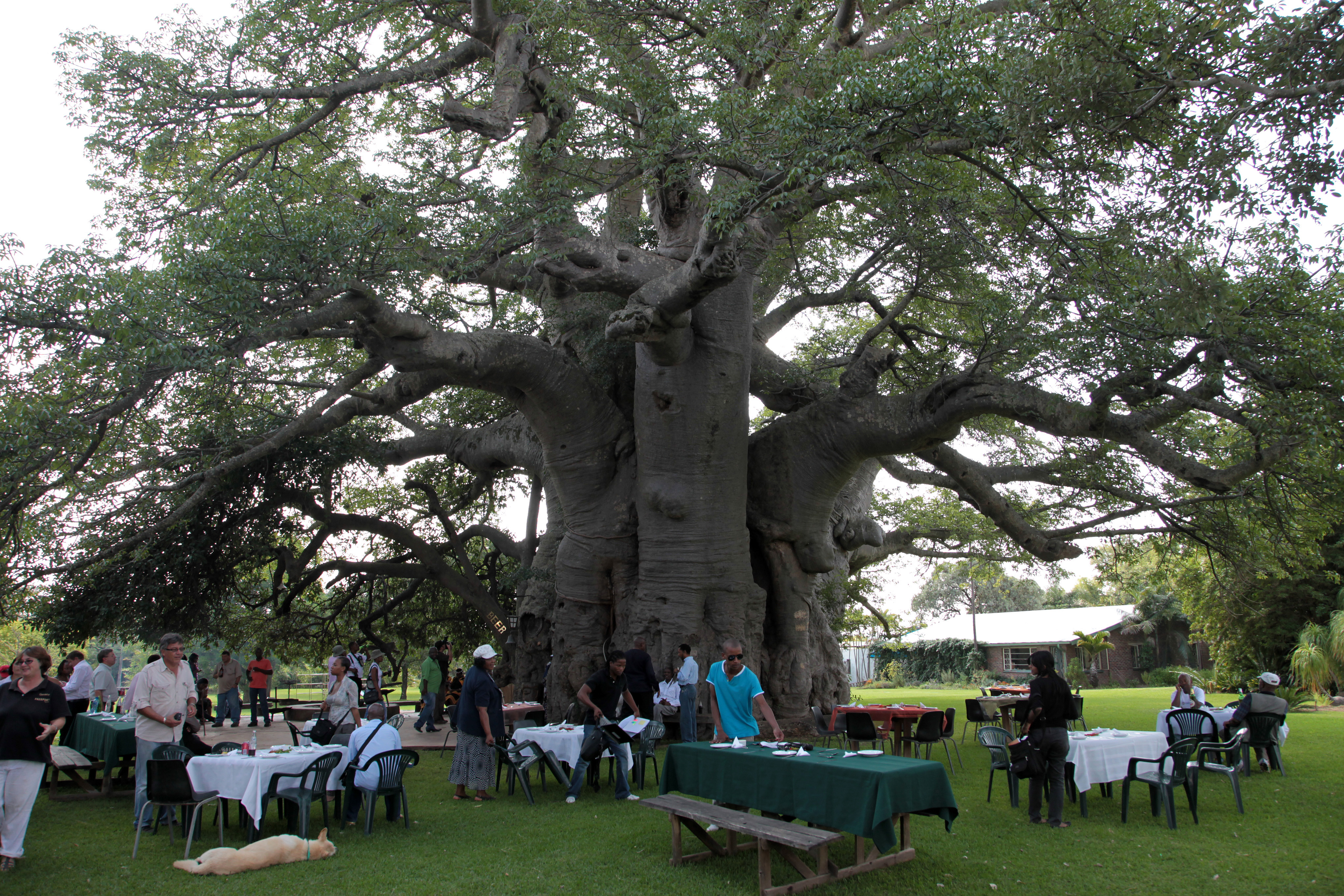

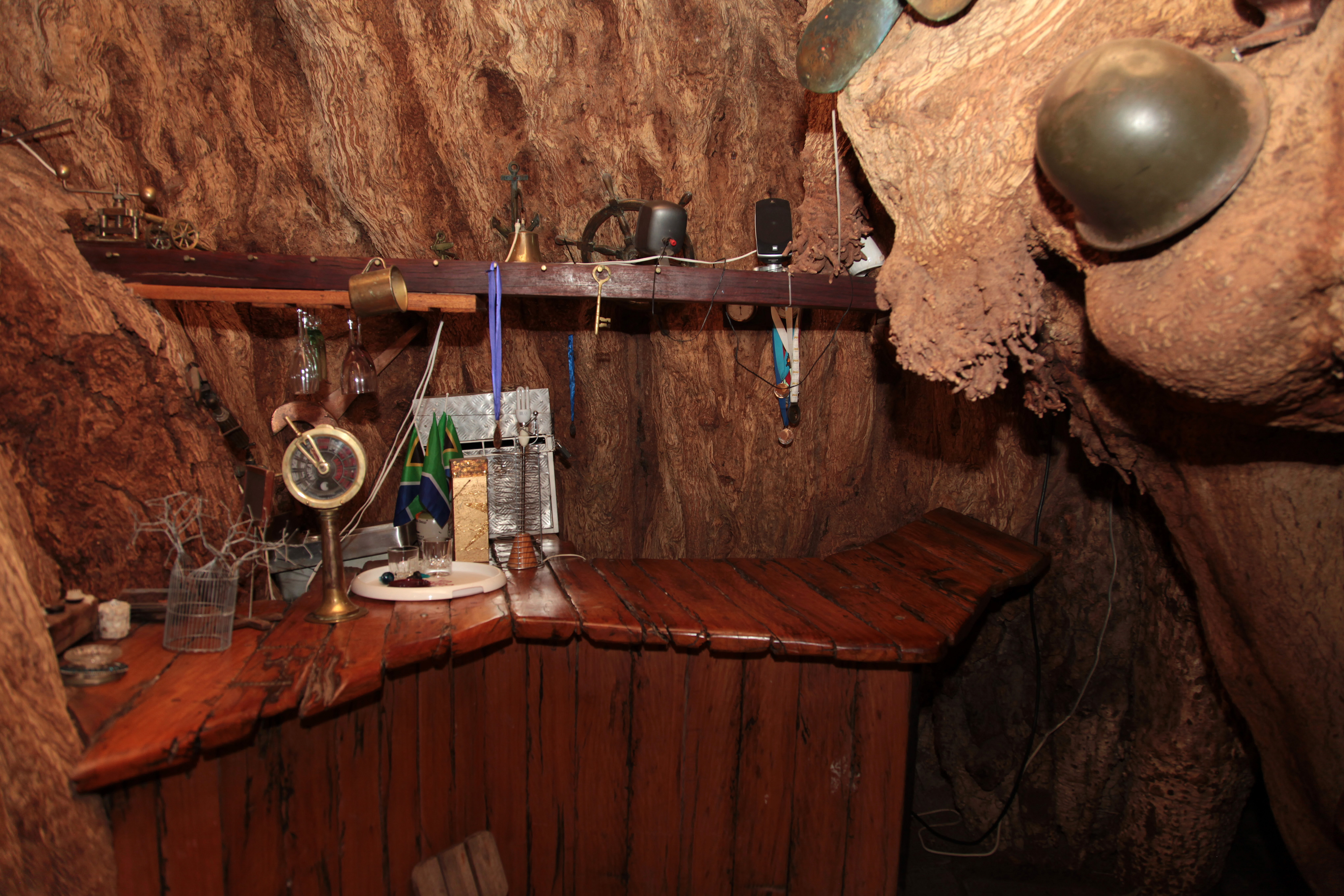
Inside

== See also ==
- List of oldest trees
- List of individual trees
