= Seal Bay Regional Nature Park =

Protected area in British Columbia, Canada

Coordinates: 49°45′20″N 124°58′45″W

Seal Bay Regional Nature Park is a protected area on eastern Vancouver Island about 8 kilometers north of Comox. Its sandy soil, mapped mostly as Bowser series in 1959, was inferior for agriculture.

Consequently the land was allocated to exploitable forest. Lumbering was practiced in 1913 and the early 1920s with Douglas-fir, bigleaf maple and red alder allowed to form a second-growth forest which stands today.

At the shore to the Strait of Georgia a variety of marine life may be seen or heard, including California sea lion, harbour seal, and sea birds.
