= P. weirii =

P. weirii may refer to:

- Phellinus weirii, a fungal plant pathogen
- Poria weirii, a fungal plant pathogen
