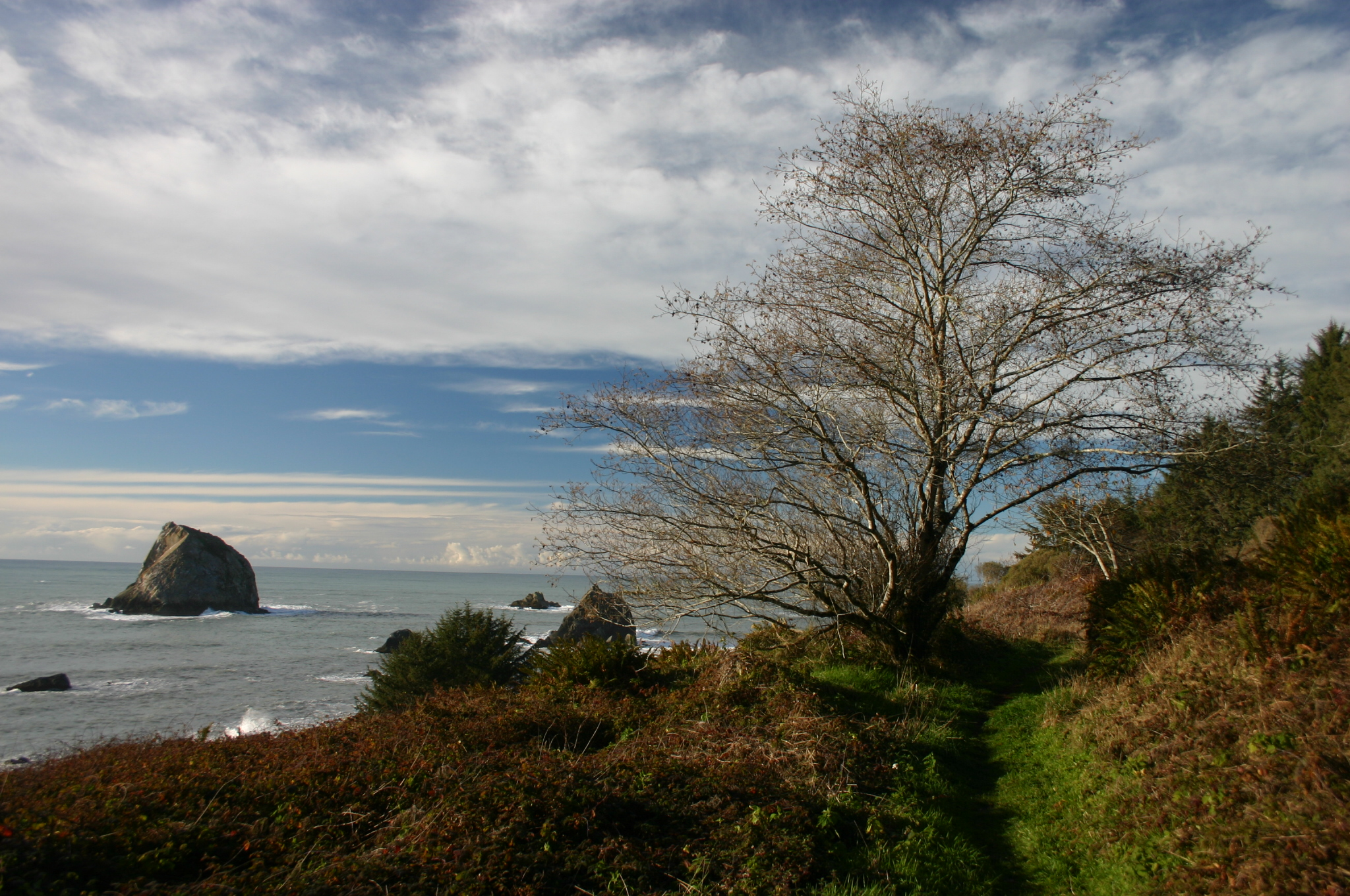
- A red alder in northern California

Conservation status
- Least Concern (IUCN 3.1)

Scientific classification
- Kingdom: Plantae
- Clade: Embryophytes
- Clade: Tracheophytes
- Clade: Angiosperms
- Clade: Eudicots
- Clade: Rosids
- Order: Fagales
- Family: Betulaceae
- Genus: Alnus
- Subgenus: Alnus subg. Alnus
- Species: A. rubra

Binomial name
- Alnus rubra Bong.
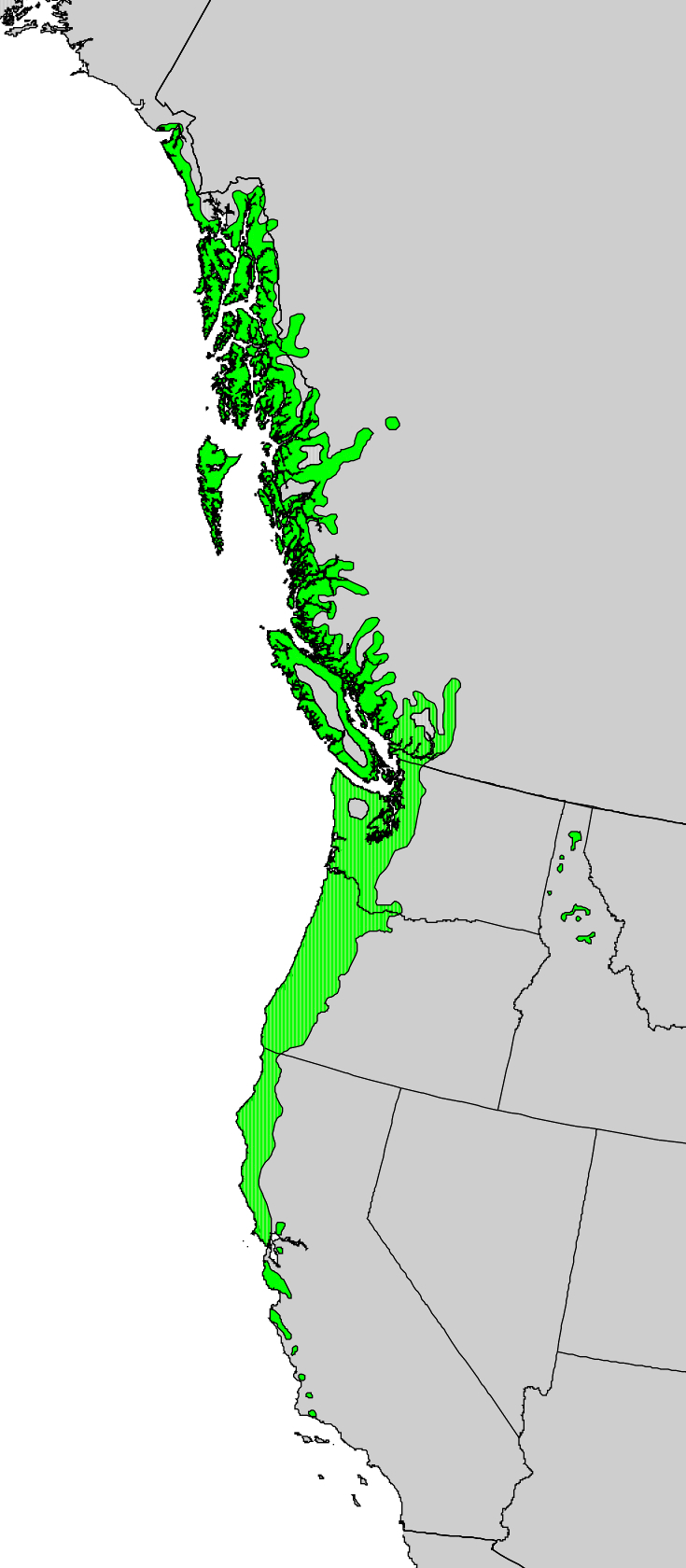
- Natural range of Alnus rubra

Synonyms
- Alnus incana var. rubra (Bong.) Regel; Alnus oregana Nutt.; Alnus rubra var. pinnatisecta Starker; Alnus rubra f. pinnatisecta (Starker) Rehder

= Alnus rubra =

Species of tree

Alnus rubra, the red alder, is a deciduous broadleaf tree native to western North America (Alaska, Yukon, British Columbia, Washington, Oregon, California, Idaho and Montana).

== Description ==
Alnus rubra is the largest species of alder in North America and one of the largest in the world, reaching heights of 20 to 30 metres (66 to 98 ft). The official tallest red alder (as of 1979) stands 32 m (105 ft) tall in Clatsop County, Oregon (US). The trunks range from 25 to 50 centimetres (10 to 19 1/2 in) in diameter. The bark is mottled, ashy-gray and smooth, often colonized by white lichen and moss. The leaves are ovate, 7 to 15 centimetres (2 3/4 to 6 in) long, with bluntly serrated edges and a distinct point at the end; the leaf margin is revolute, the very edge being curled under, a diagnostic character which distinguishes it from all other alders. Rather than turning yellow in autumn, its leaves darken in colour and wither before they are shed. The male flowers are dangling reddish catkins 10 to 15 cm (4 to 6 in) long in early spring. Female flowers occur in clusters of (3) 4–6 (8). Female catkins are erect during anthesis, but otherwise pendant. They develop into small, woody, superficially cone-like oval dry fruit 2 to 3 cm (3/4 to 1 1/4 in) long. The seeds develop between the woody bracts of the "cones" and are shed in late autumn and winter. Red alder seeds have a membranous winged margin that allows long-distance dispersal.

Specimens can live to about 60 years of age before being seriously afflicted by heart rot.

== Taxonomy ==
The name derives from the bright rusty red color that develops in bruised or scraped bark.

== Distribution ==
Alnus rubra grows from Southeast Alaska to central coastal California, nearly always within about 200 kilometres (120 mi) of the Pacific coast, except for an extension 600 km (370 mi) inland across Washington and Oregon into northernmost Montana. It can be found from sea level to elevations of 900 m (3,000 ft).

== Ecology ==
In southern Alaska, western British Columbia and the northwestern Pacific Coast Ranges of the United States, red alder grows on cool and moist slopes; inland and at the southern end of its range (California) it grows mostly along the margins of watercourses and wetlands. It is shade intolerant.

In moist forest areas, Alnus rubra will rapidly cover a former burn or clearcut, often preventing the establishment of conifers. It is a prolific seed producer, but the small, wind-dispersed seeds require an open area of mineral soil to germinate, and so skid trails and other areas disturbed by logging or fire are ideal seedbeds. Such areas may host several hundred thousand to several million seedlings per hectare in the first year after landscape disturbance.

Twigs and buds of alder are only fair browse for wildlife, but deer and elk browse the twigs in fall and twigs and buds in the winter and spring. Beaver occasionally eat the bark, though it is not a preferred species. Several finches eat alder seeds, notably common redpoll and pine siskin, and as do deer mice. Tent caterpillars often feed on the leaves, but the trees usually recover within a year.

The tree hosts the nitrogen-fixing actinomycete Frankia in nodules on roots. This association allows alder to grow in nitrogen-poor soils, and makes the species an important early colonizer of disturbed forests and riparian areas. This self-fertilizing trait allows red alder to grow rapidly, and makes it effective in covering disturbed and/or degraded land, such as mine spoils. Imported Red Alder can make successful associations with Frankia strains present in the UK. Alder leaves, shed in the fall, decay readily to form a nitrogen-enriched humus making the nitrogen available to other species.

=== Common associates ===
Red alder is associated with coast Douglas-fir (Pseudotsuga menziesii subsp. menziesii), western hemlock (Tsuga heterophylla), grand fir (Abies grandis), western redcedar (Thuja plicata), and Sitka spruce (Picea sitchensis) forests.

Along stream banks, it is commonly associated with willows (Salix spp.), red osier dogwood (Cornus stolonifera), Oregon ash (Fraxinus latifolia), and bigleaf maple (Acer macrophyllum).

To the southeast of its range, it is replaced by white alder (Alnus rhombifolia), which is a tree of similar stature, but which differs in the leaf margins not being rolled under, lack of distinct lobes, and lack of membranous wings on seed margins. In the high mountains, it is replaced by the smaller and more shrub-like Sitka alder (Alnus viridis subsp. sinuata), and east of the Cascade Mountains by thinleaf alder (Alnus incana subsp. tenuifolia).

== Uses ==
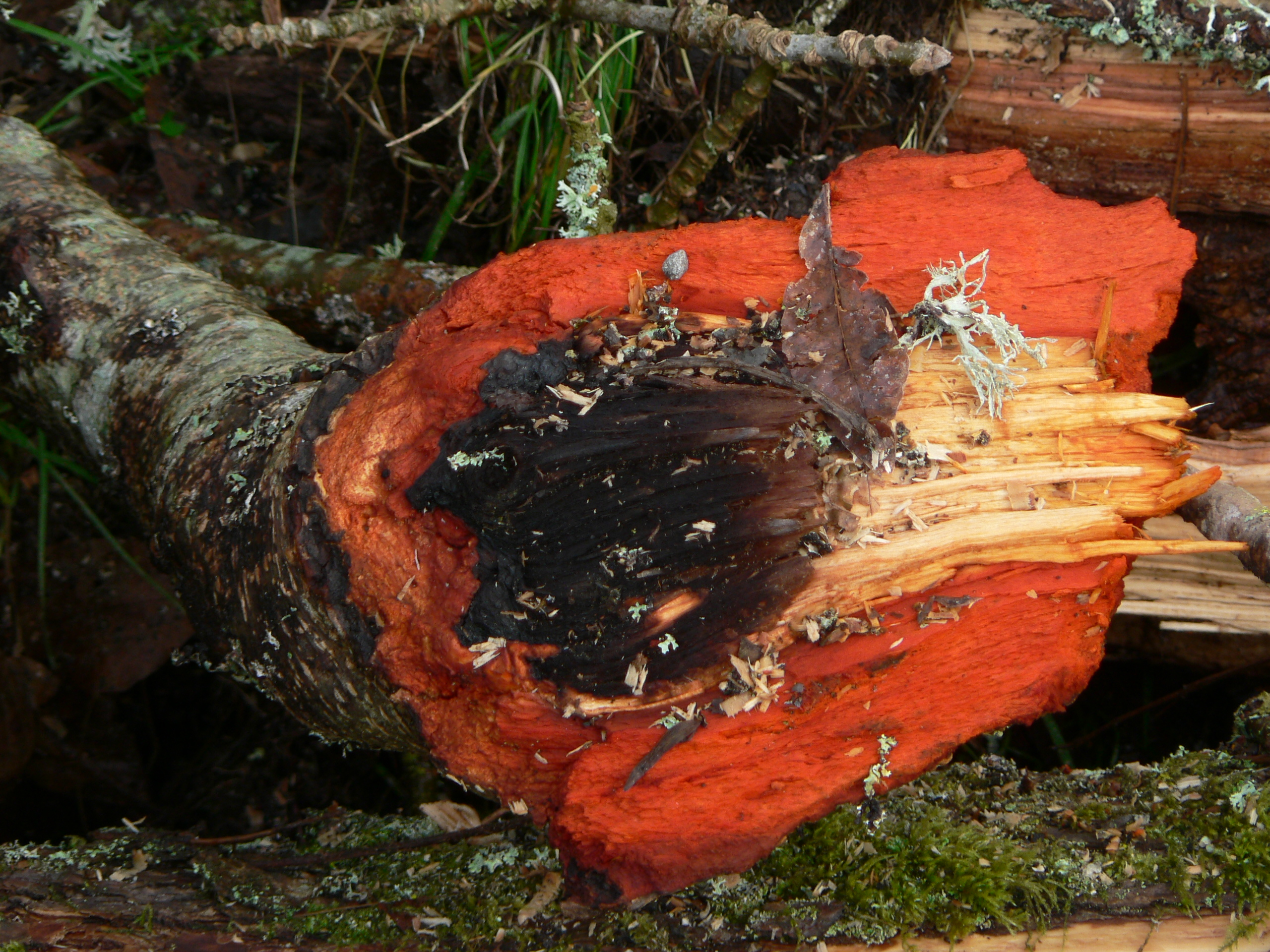
Broken branch showing red weathered bark

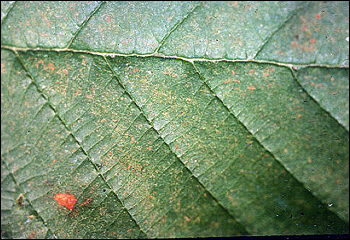
Typical leaf discoloration caused by ozone pollution

=== As dye ===
A russet dye can be made from a decoction of the bark, apparently due to the tannin it contains, and was used by Native Americans to dye fishing nets to make them less visible underwater.

=== Medicine ===
Native Americans used red alder bark to treat poison oak reactions, insect bites, skin irritations, and open wounds. Blackfeet Indians used an infusion made from the bark of red alder to treat lymphatic disorders and tuberculosis. Recent clinical studies have verified that red alder contains betulin and lupeol, compounds shown to be effective against a variety of tumors.

=== Restoration ===
In addition to its use as a nitrogen fixer, red alder is occasionally used as a rotation crop to discourage the conifer root pathogen Phellinus weirii (causing laminated root rot).

Alnus rubra is occasionally planted as ornamental trees and will do well in Swales, riparian areas, or on stream banks, in light-textured soils that drain well. Red alder does not thrive in heavy, wet clay soils. If planted domestically, alders should be planted well away from drainpipes, sewage pipes, and water lines, as the roots may invade and clog the lines.

=== Woodworking ===
Alder lumber is not considered to be a durable option for outdoor applications,, but due to its workability and ease of finishing, it is increasingly used for furniture and cabinetry. Because it is softer than other popular hardwoods such as maple, walnut, and ash, alder has historically been considered of low value for timber. However, it is now becoming one of the more popular hardwood alternatives as it is economically priced compared to other hardwoods. In the world of musical instrument construction, red alder is valued by some electric guitar and electric bass builders for its balanced tonality. Alder is frequently used by Native Americans for making masks, bowls, tool handles, and other small goods.

The appearance of alder lumber is almost white when freshly cut, but quickly changes to a light tan or light brown with a yellow or reddish tinge when exposed to the air. Heartwood is formed only in trees of advanced age, and there is no visible boundary between heartwood and sapwood. It has an even grain and has medium luster. It is easily worked, glues well, and takes a good finish, but is prone to denting.

It has a Janka hardness rating of 590 lbf. and a moderate specific gravity (density), averaging around 0.45 to 0.51.

=== Fish smoking ===
Because of its oily smoke, A. rubra is the wood of choice for smoking salmon.

=== As an environmental indicator ===
Red alder is often used by scientists as a biomonitoring organism to locate areas prone to ozone pollution, as the leaves react to the presence of high ozone levels by developing red to brown or purple discolorations.

=== Forestry ===
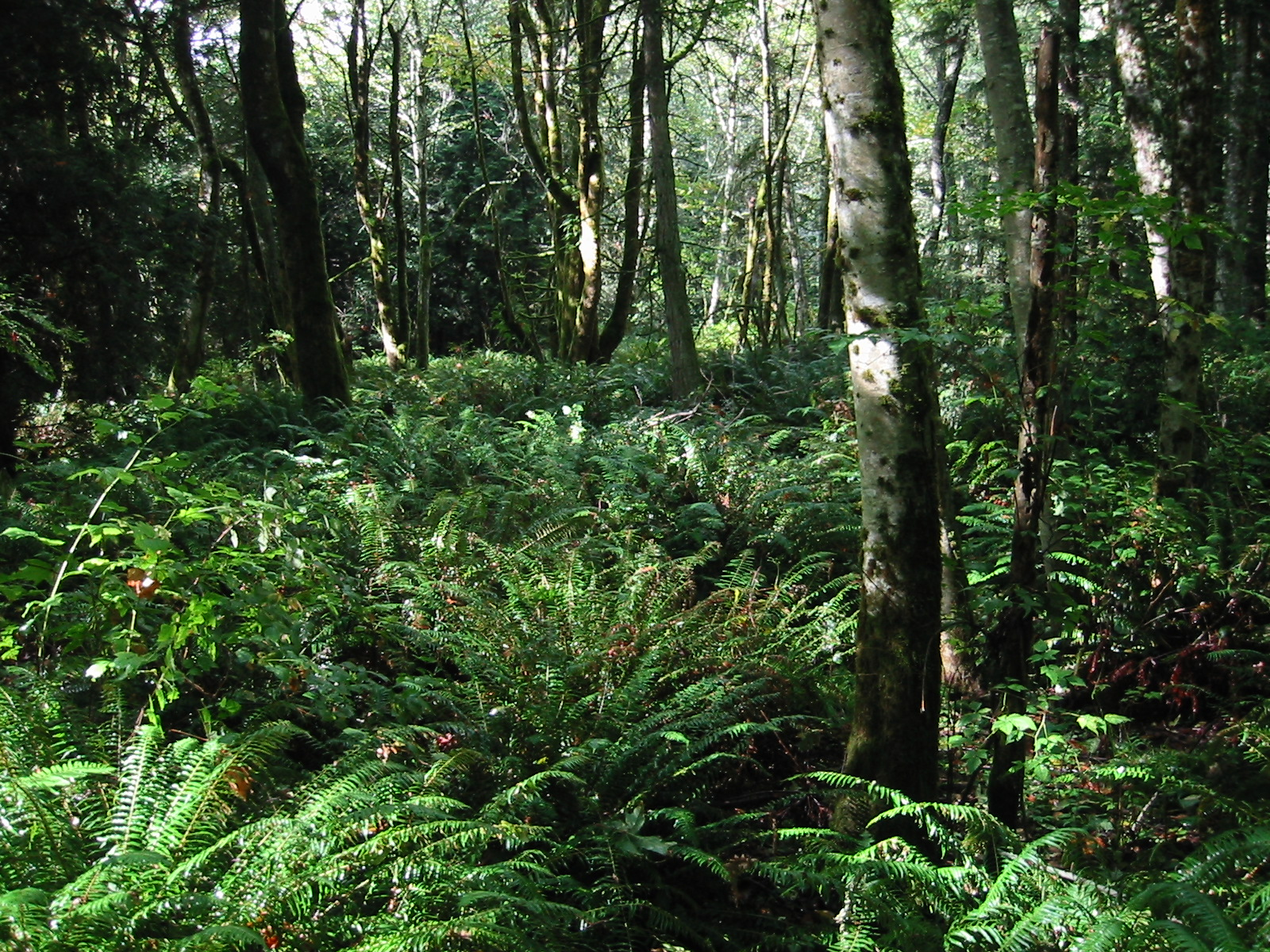
Red alder, western hemlock, and bigleaf maple forest

With a current inventory of about 7.4 billion cubic feet (210 million cubic metres), red alder comprises 60% of the total hardwood volume in the Pacific Northwest, and is by far the most valuable hardwood in term of diversity of products, commercial value, and manufacturing employment. Increasing value of alder logs, combined with a better understanding of the species' ecological role, has led some land managers to tolerate and, in some cases, manage for alder.

As an "aggressive pioneer" that was freely able to rapidly colonise areas to the detriment of the more valuable conifer species, it was regarded for a long time as a weed and was neglected for its timber potential, however breeding programmes to improve stem form and timber quality are now underway.

Since most forest land in the Northwest is managed for conifer production, over 200,000 acres (80,000 hectares) of timberland is sprayed with herbicides annually in Oregon alone to control red alder and other competing hardwood species. Red alder's rapid early growth can interfere with the establishment of conifer plantations. Herbicide spraying of red alder over large areas of coastal Oregon and Washington has resulted in several lawsuits claiming it has caused health problems, including birth defects and other human health effects.

In addition to adding soil nitrogen, rotations of red alder are used to reduce laminated root rot in Douglas-fir forests. Nurse stands of red alder may also reduce spruce weevil damage in Sitka spruce stands on the Olympic Peninsula. Alder continues to attract interest as log values approach and often exceed those of Douglas-fir. This interest is limited by red alder's total stand productivity, which is significantly lower than that of Douglas-fir and western hemlock.

== Gallery ==
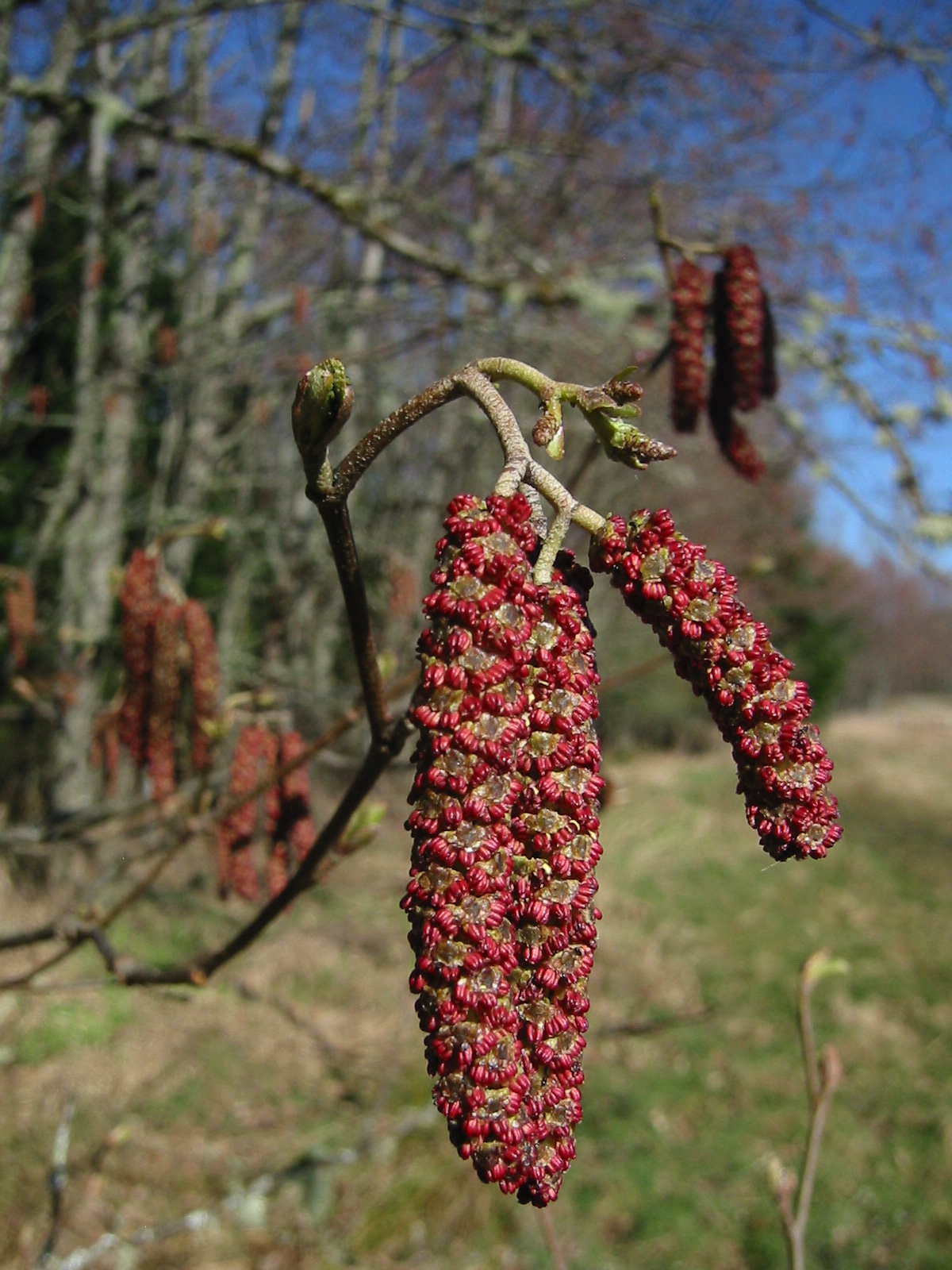
Male catkins with tiny female catkins above

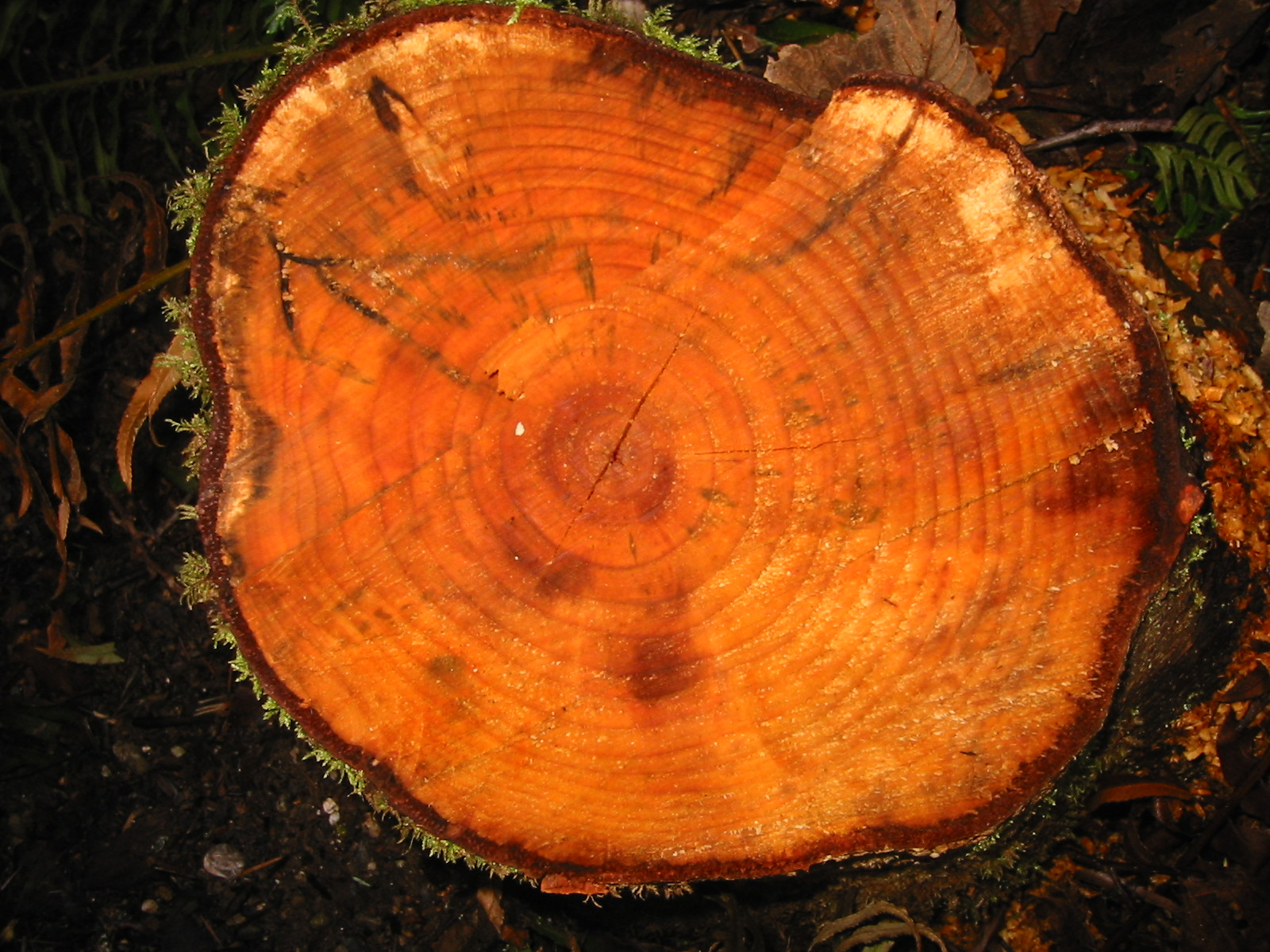
Stump

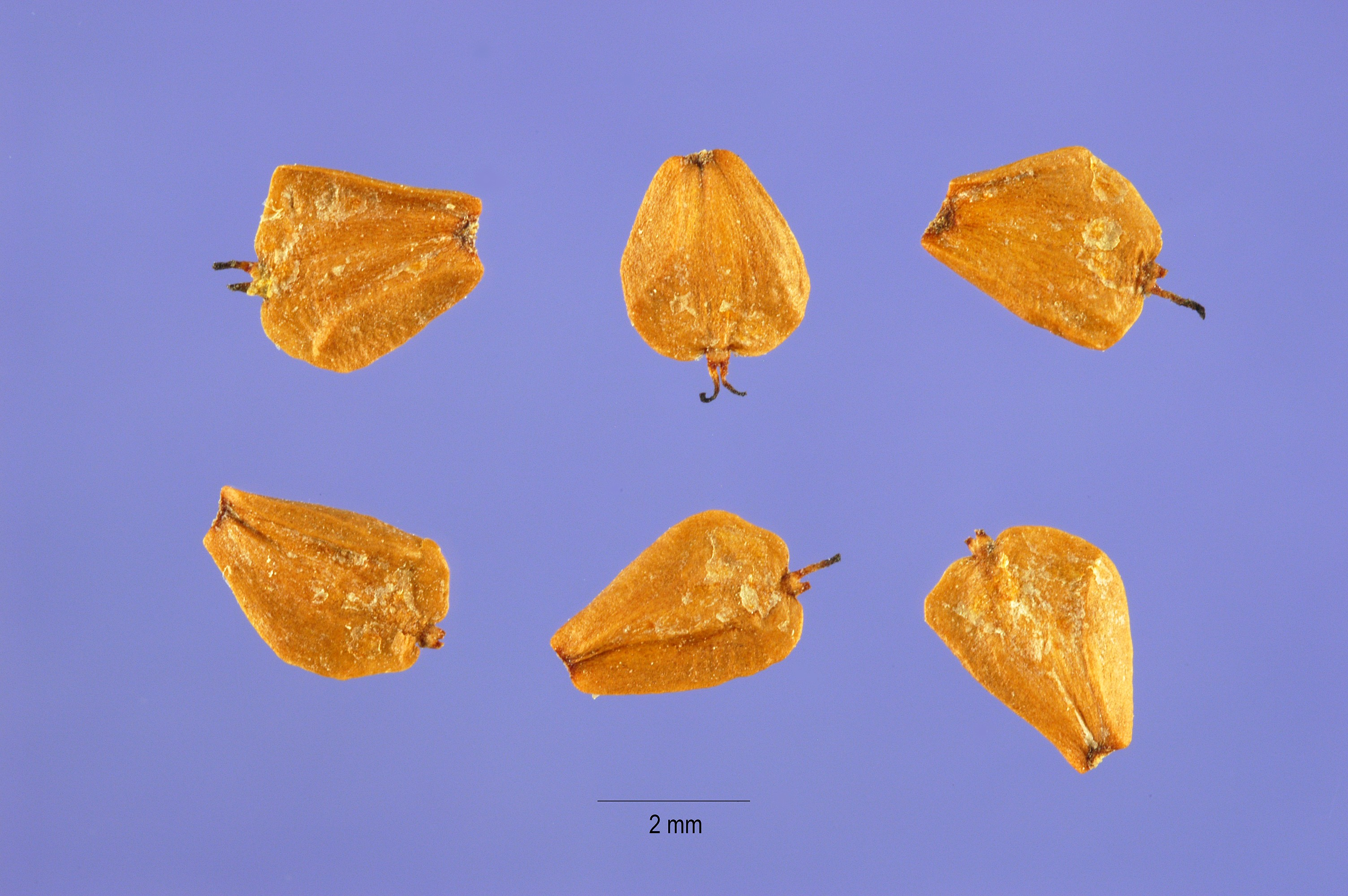
Seeds

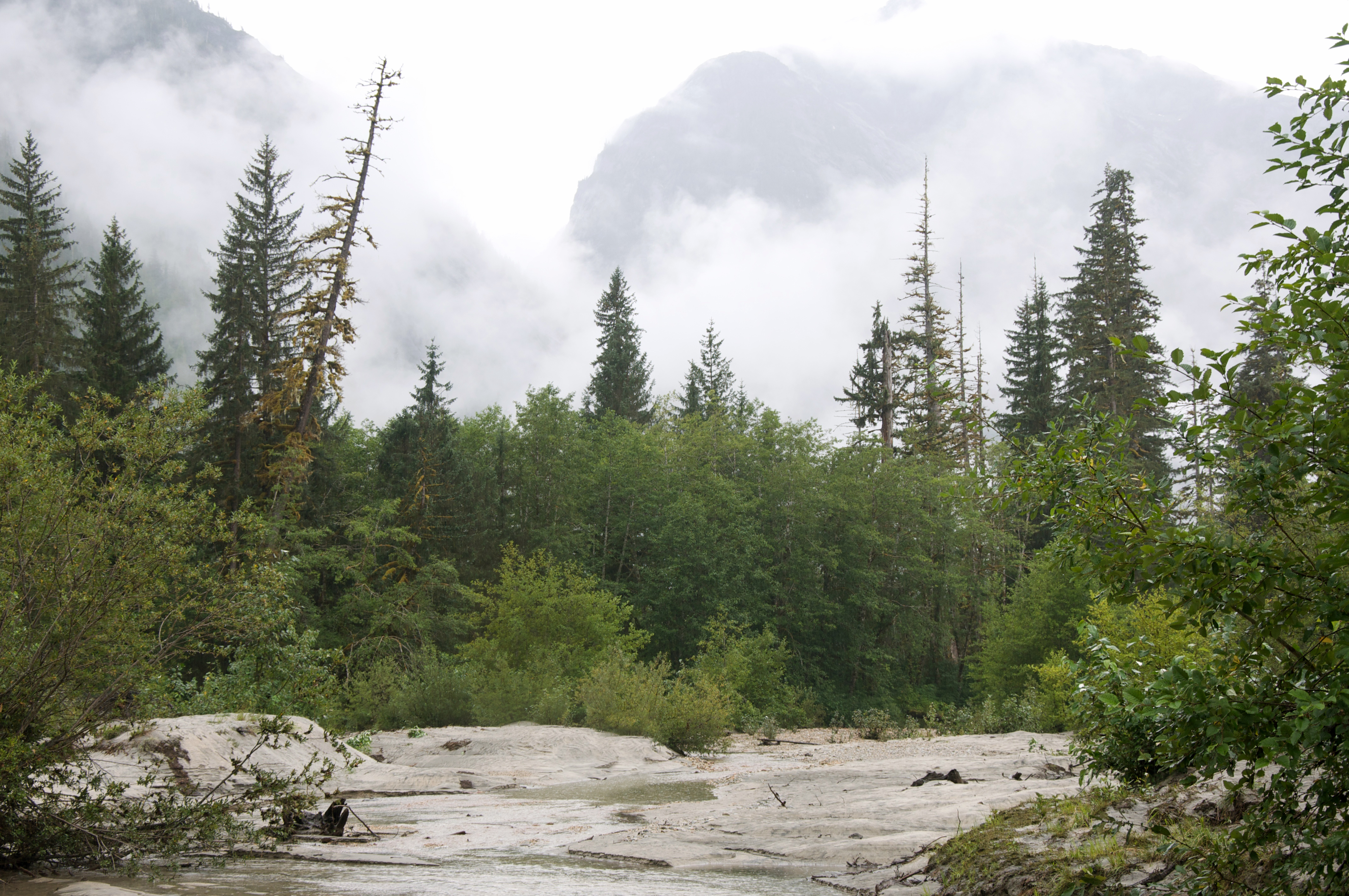
Habitat in British Columbia

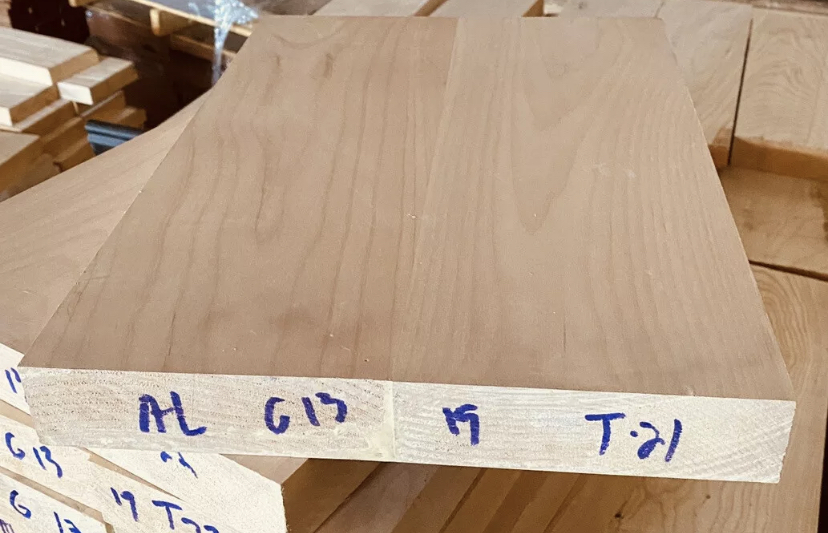
In luthiery

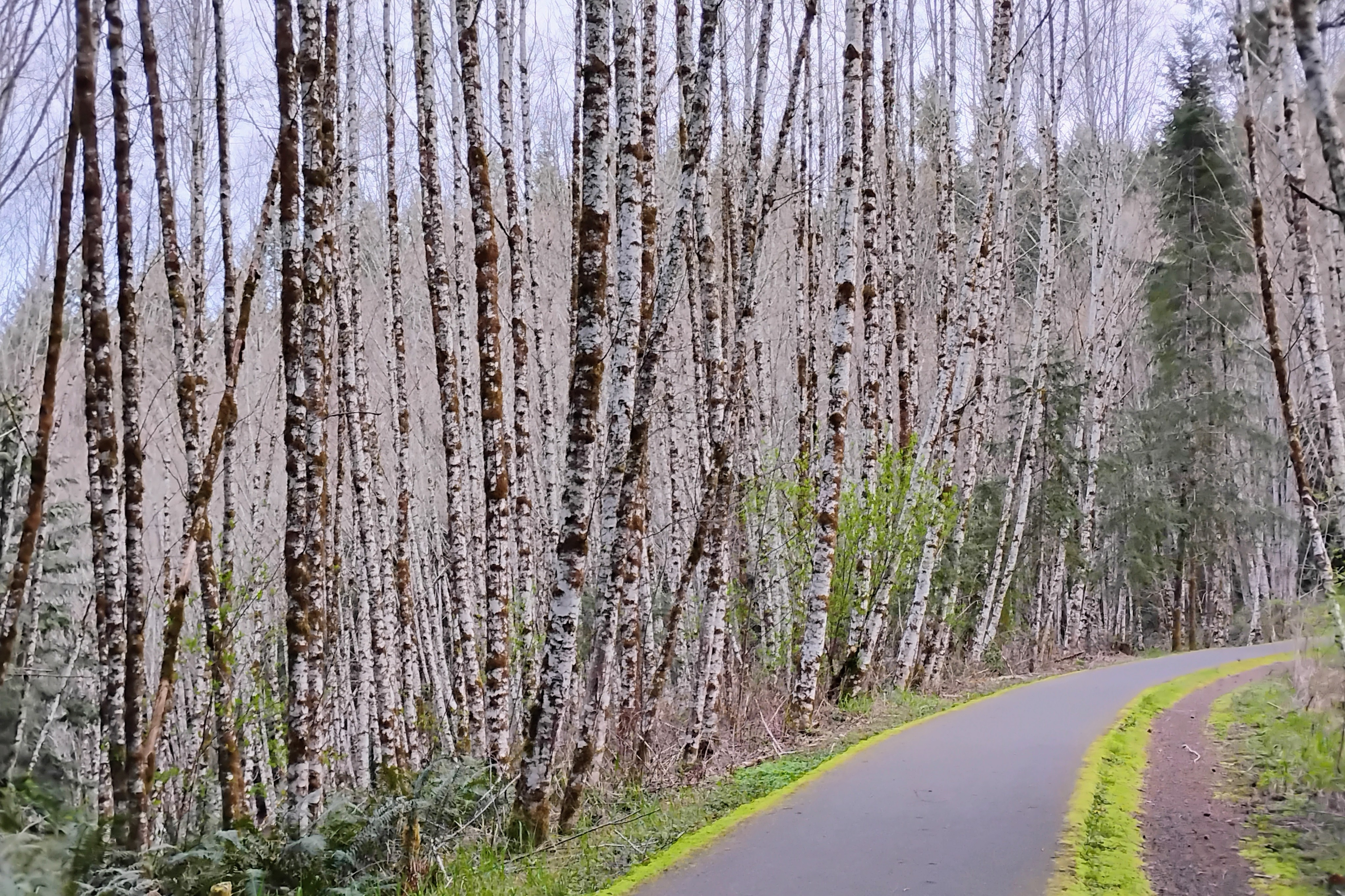
Young Alnus rubra trees, Buxton, Oregon
