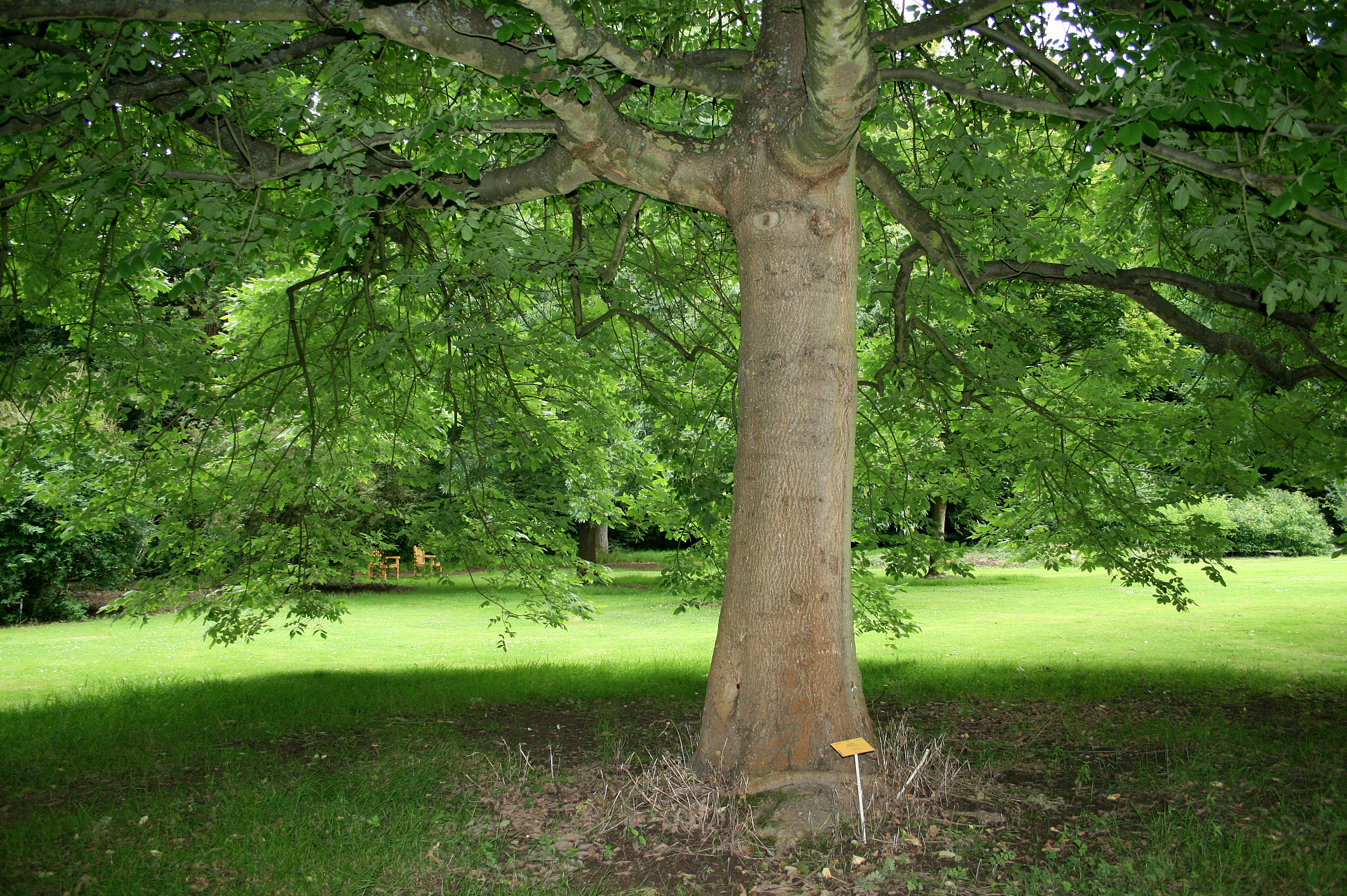
- A mature tree at the Meise Botanic Garden
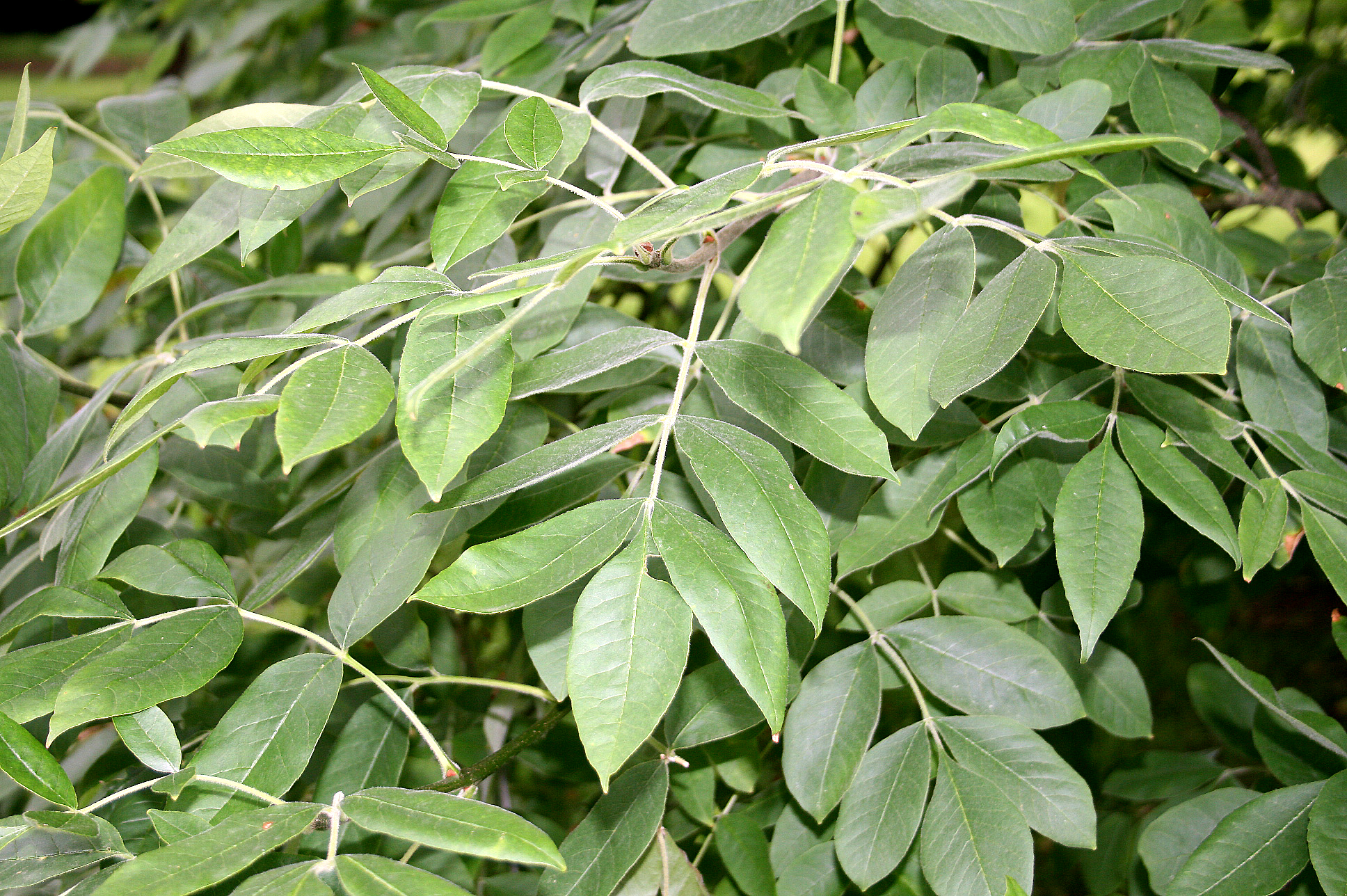
- Leaves of the Oregon ash

Conservation status
- Near Threatened (IUCN 3.1)

- Secure (NatureServe)

Scientific classification
- Kingdom: Plantae
- Clade: Tracheophytes
- Clade: Angiosperms
- Clade: Eudicots
- Clade: Asterids
- Order: Lamiales
- Family: Oleaceae
- Genus: Fraxinus
- Section: Fraxinus sect. Melioides
- Species: F. latifolia

Binomial name
- Fraxinus latifolia Benth.
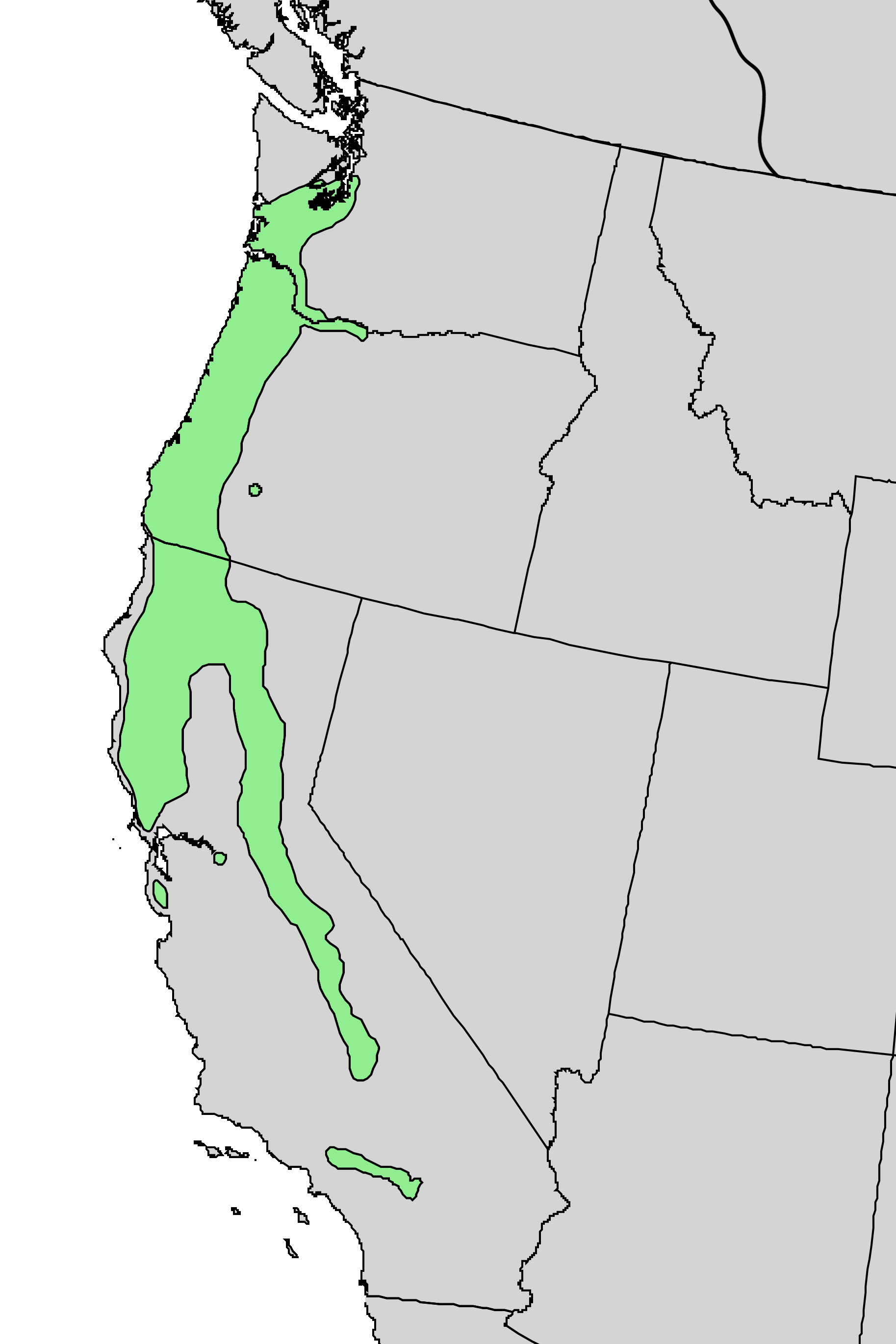
- Native range

Synonyms
- Fraxinus oregona

= Fraxinus latifolia =

Oregon ash

Species of ash

Fraxinus latifolia, the Oregon ash, is a member of the ash genus Fraxinus, native to western North America.

== Description ==
Fraxinus latifolia is a medium-sized deciduous tree that can grow to heights of 20–25 metres (65–80 feet) in height, with a trunk diameter of 40–75 centimetres (16–30 inches) in its 100−150-year average life span. Oregon ash can grow considerably larger and can have well over a 200-year life span, or become stunted and very small in more dry habitats. It can develop a broad crown, almost as wide as a bigleaf maple (Acer macrophyllum) when it grows in the open, but crowns remain narrow when they are part of a denser tree stand, similar to that of red alder (Alnus rubra).

The bark is distinctive with dark gray–brown, and it will eventually develop a woven pattern of deep fissures and ridges. The compound leaves are pinnate, 12–33 cm (4 3/4–13 in) long, with 5–9 leaflets attached in pairs to a linear stalk and an additional leaflet at the tip. Each leaflet is ovate, 6–12 cm (2 1/4–4 3/4 in) long and 3–4 cm (1 1/8–1 5/8 in) broad. The leaves are noticeably lighter green than those of associated broadleaf species, and turn bright yellow and fall off early in autumn. It is common for the leaves and bark to show signs of disease and brown rot on otherwise healthy plants. After leaves have fallen off the plant in fall and before it begins to leaf out, Oregon ash can be identified by its stout twigs and opposite branching arrangement and opposing buds. Unlike bigleaf maples, ash twigs have woolly hairs. In mid to late spring, the tree produces small flowers that are not very noticeable. It is dioecious; it requires two separate plants (male and female) to successfully pollinate and reproduce. The fruit, produced by female trees, is a cluster of samaras, 3–5 cm (1 1/8–2 in) long that includes wings similar to maple trees. It is shaped like a canoe, with the small seed located near one end.

== Distribution and habitat ==
Fraxinus latifolia is found on the west side of the Cascade Range from southwestern British Columbia south through western Washington, western Oregon, and northwestern California; and in central California in the Sierra Nevada.

The Oregon ash grows mostly in wet habitats and prefers damp, loose soils such as sloughs, swales, wet meadows, swamps, streams, and bottomlands. It grows from sea level to 900 m (3,000 ft) in elevation, up to 1,700 m (5,600 ft) in the south of the range in California. In central Southern California, it integrates with Fraxinus velutina (velvet ash) of southern California east into Arizona.

== Ecology ==
Oregon ash is intolerant of shade, and may eventually be replaced by more competitive trees such as bigleaf maples or conifers that block the light with their leaves or sheer size. This tree flourishes when its habitat become opened due to floods, blowdowns, or other disturbances. Oregon ash sprouts vigorously from cut stumps or fire-killed trees. Young trees typically grow vigorously for their first 60 years, with their growth slowing considerably in the following years.

This particular species of ash is well adapted to soggy ground due to its moderately shallow, but extensive and wide-spreading root system. This also allows for the tree to withstand wind storms exceptionally well. Ash tolerates flooding considerably better than Douglas-fir and grand fir. Oregon ash also provides nourishment to songbirds, squirrels, and water fowl by way of its seeds. Deer and elk have also been known to graze its foliage and sprouts.

== Uses ==
The wood of Oregon ash compares favorably to the valuable lumber of eastern ashes, but it is seldom used for hardwood products because of its limited availability and distribution. The Cowlitz Indian Tribe used its wood for canoe paddles and digging sticks. Europeans, and later European Americans, have long preferred similar species of ash for comparable purposes such as tool handles and sports equipment. The light color of the wood is somewhat lustrous, hard, strong, stiff, high in shock resistance, flexible, workable with machines, and wears smooth with use. The commercial application of Oregon ash has been limited due to the much more abundant eastern ashes. The young and fast-growing wood of ash is more elastic and more favorable for handles and baseball bats because it has wider growth rings. The wood of old ash trees in general are valued for firewood due to their fine grain and brittleness. It is commonly used as an ornamental or shade tree within and beyond it native range of the Pacific Northwest because of its rapid growth rate, symmetrical shape, and hardiness. It has also been known to be used for wind breaks and to help with riparian restoration due to its wide root system and quick growth.

Thomas Nuttall found that stories persisted in Oregon that rattlesnakes would admonish sticks from the tree; this was historically reported by Pliny the Elder.
