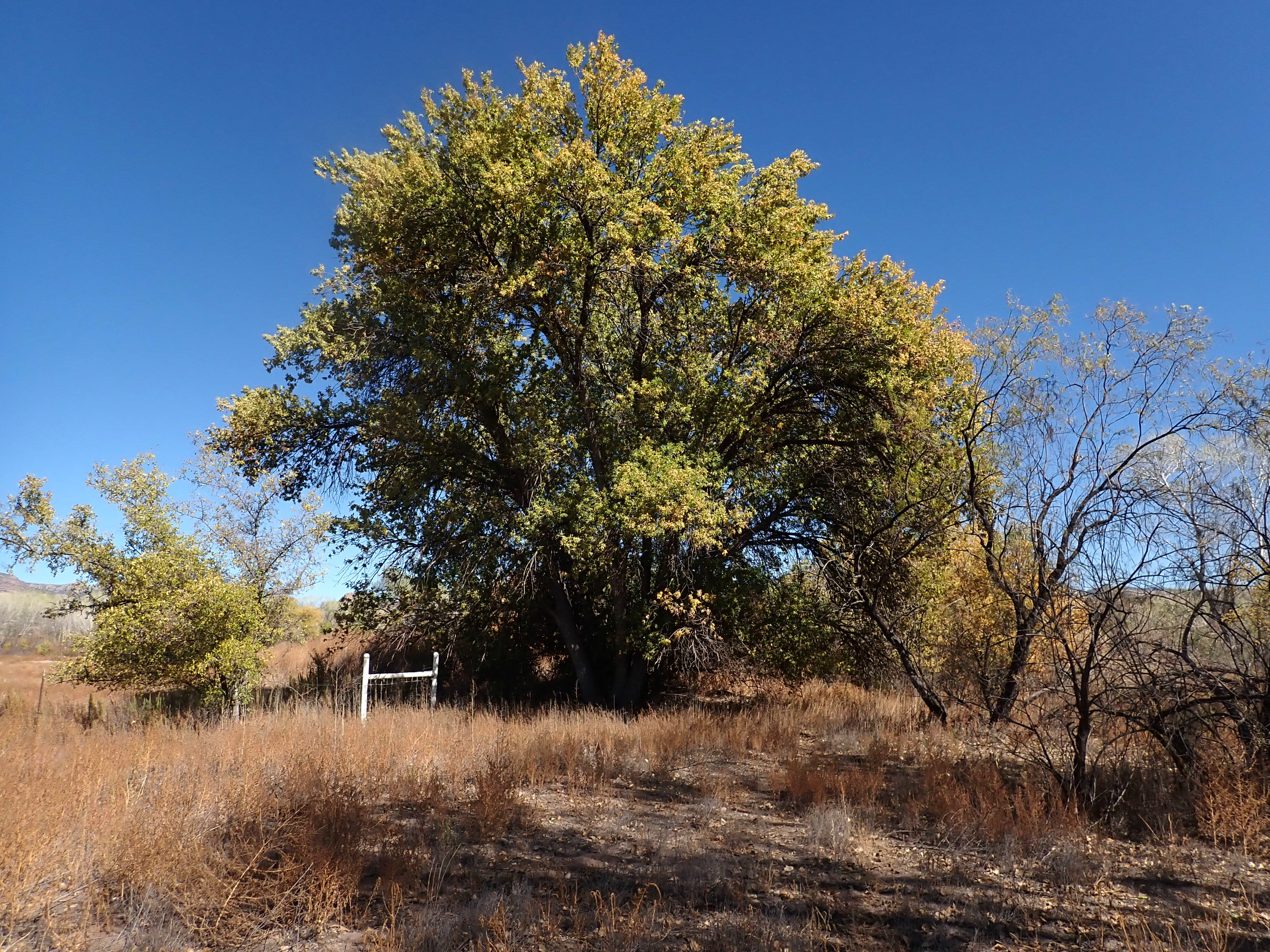

Scientific classification
- Kingdom: Plantae
- Clade: Tracheophytes
- Clade: Angiosperms
- Clade: Eudicots
- Clade: Asterids
- Order: Lamiales
- Family: Oleaceae
- Genus: Fraxinus
- Section: Fraxinus sect. Melioides
- Species: F. velutina

Binomial name
- Fraxinus velutina Torr.
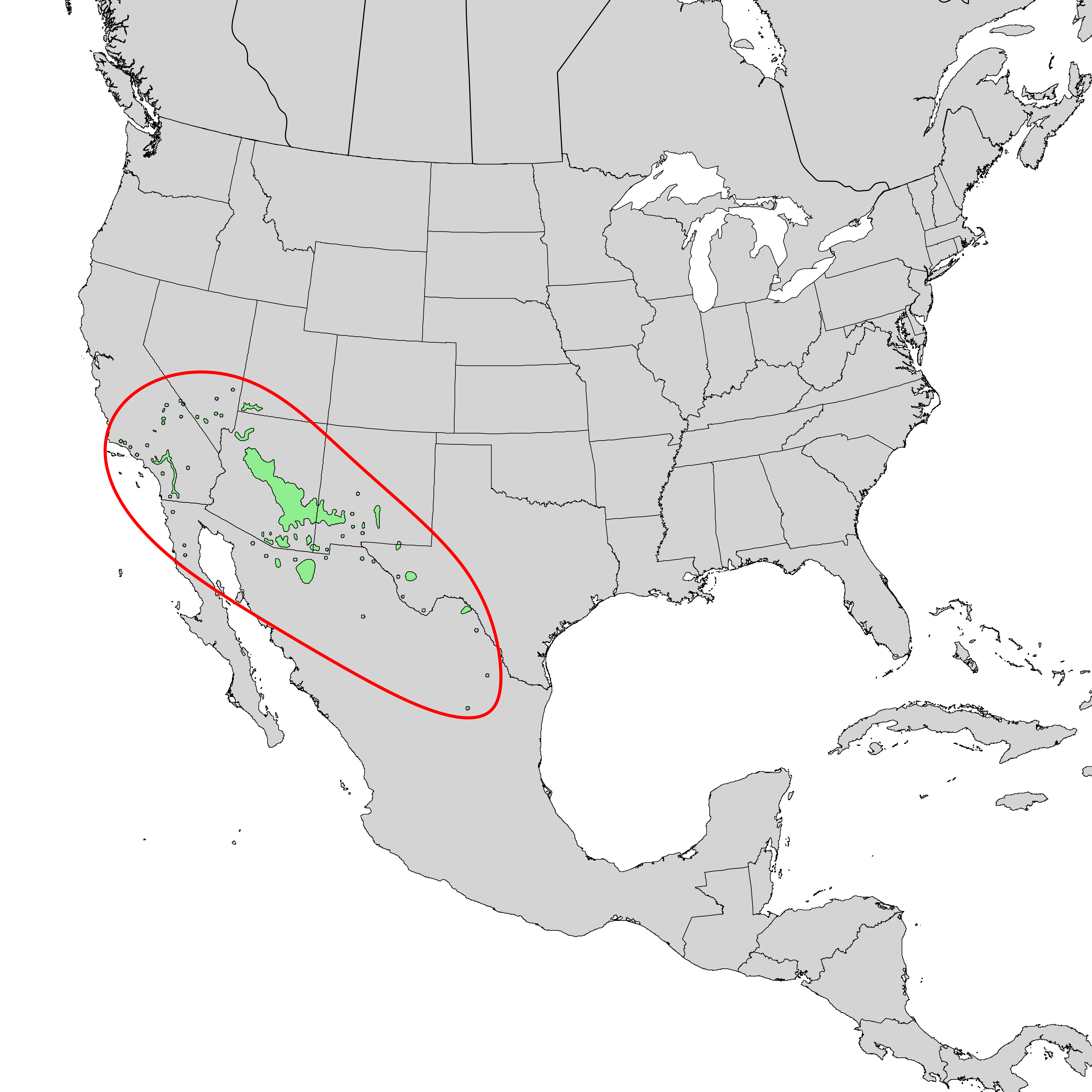
- Natural range of Fraxinus velutina
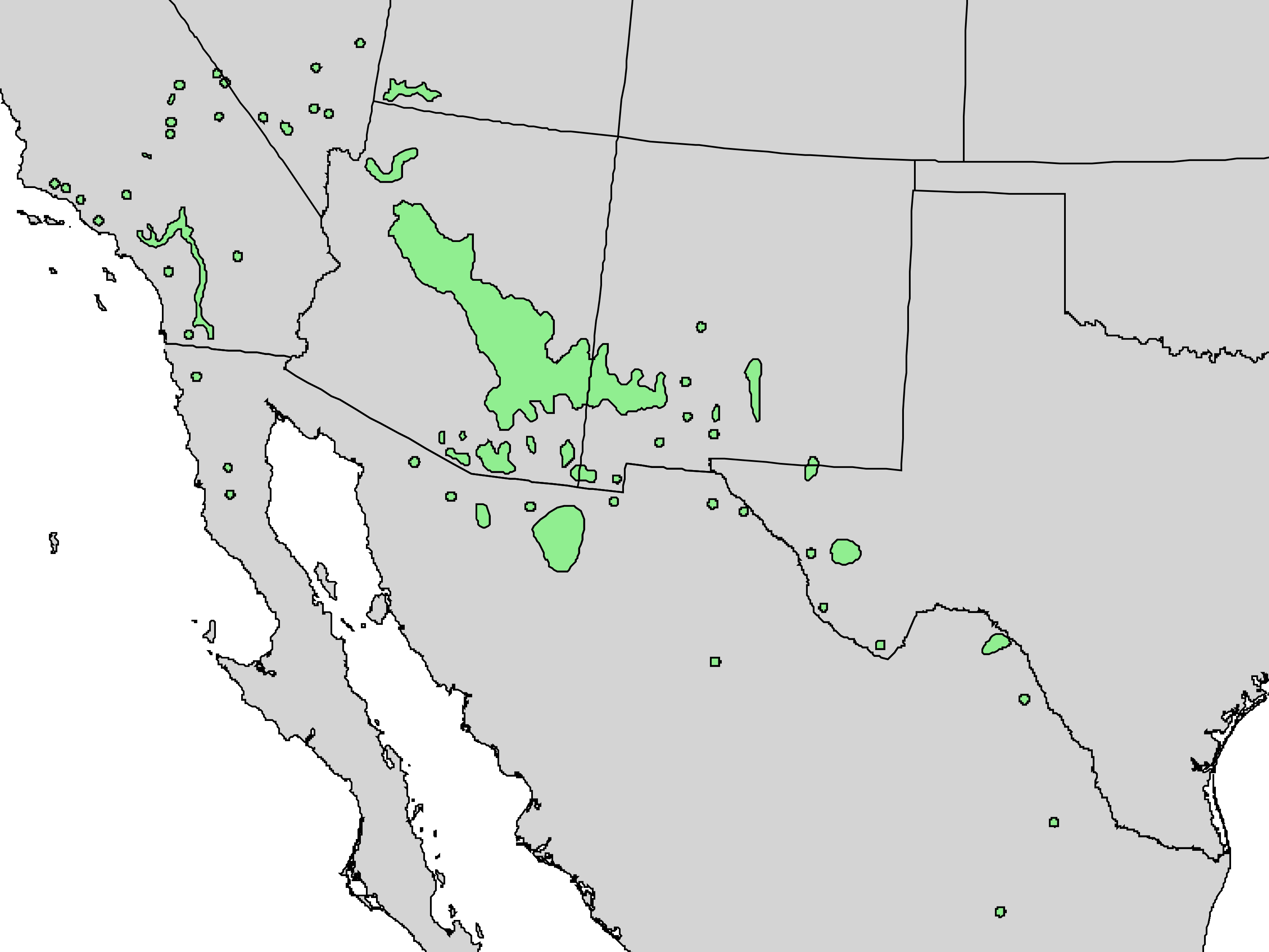
- Close-up of natural range of Fraxinus velutina

= Fraxinus velutina =

Species of ash

Fraxinus velutina, the velvet ash, Arizona ash or Modesto ash, is a species of Fraxinus native to southwestern North America, in the United States from southern California east to Texas, and in Mexico from northern Baja California east to Coahuila and Nuevo León.

== Description ==
Fraxinus velutina is a small deciduous tree growing to 10 m tall, with a trunk up to 30 cm diameter. The bark is rough gray-brown and fissured, and the shoots are velvety-downy. The leaves are 10–25 cm long, pinnately compound with five or seven (occasionally three) leaflets 4 cm or more long, with an entire or finely serrated margin. The flowers are produced in small clusters in early spring; it is dioecious, with male and female flowers on separate trees. The fruit is a samara 1.5–3 cm long, with an apical wing 4–8 mm broad.

Fraxinus velutina is closely related to Fraxinus latifolia (Oregon Ash) and Fraxinus pennsylvanica (Green Ash), replacing these species to the south of their respective ranges; it intergrades with F. latifolia in central California (around Kern County, without a clear boundary between the species.

== Distribution ==
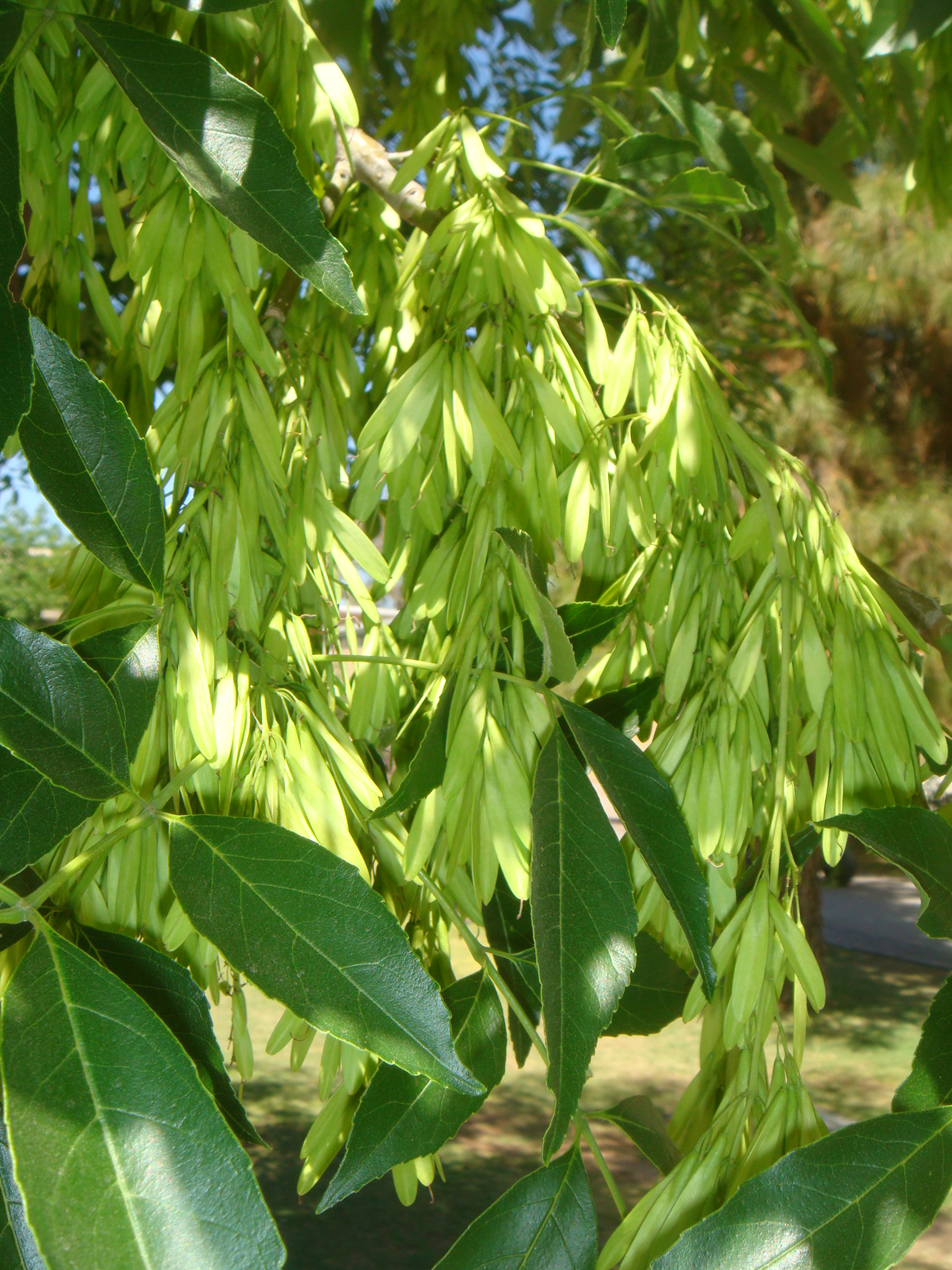
Foliage (dark green) and fruit (light green) of a mature specimen

In Arizona, the range of Fraxinus velutina is centered on the Mogollon Rim, from the northwest in the Grand Canyon feeder canyons of southern Utah and Nevada, to the central-east White Mountains (Arizona) merging into the same mountainous area of western New Mexico, then to the Rio Grande valley south to trans-Pecos Texas. In Arizona and northern Sonora it also is found in the sky island mountain ranges, the Madrean Sky Islands, and is found from central-southern Arizona, in the Sonoran Desert mountains, and the desert ranges south into northern Sonora and the very north of the Sierra Madre Occidental cordillera of Sonora and Chihuahua. Scattered populations occur eastward through the Chihuahuan Desert regions of Chihuahua, Coahuila and Nuevo León.

In California Fraxinus velutina is found in the southern Sierra Nevada, the Mojave and Colorado Deserts, and the California chaparral and woodlands ecoregion, with scattered populations extending into Baja California.
