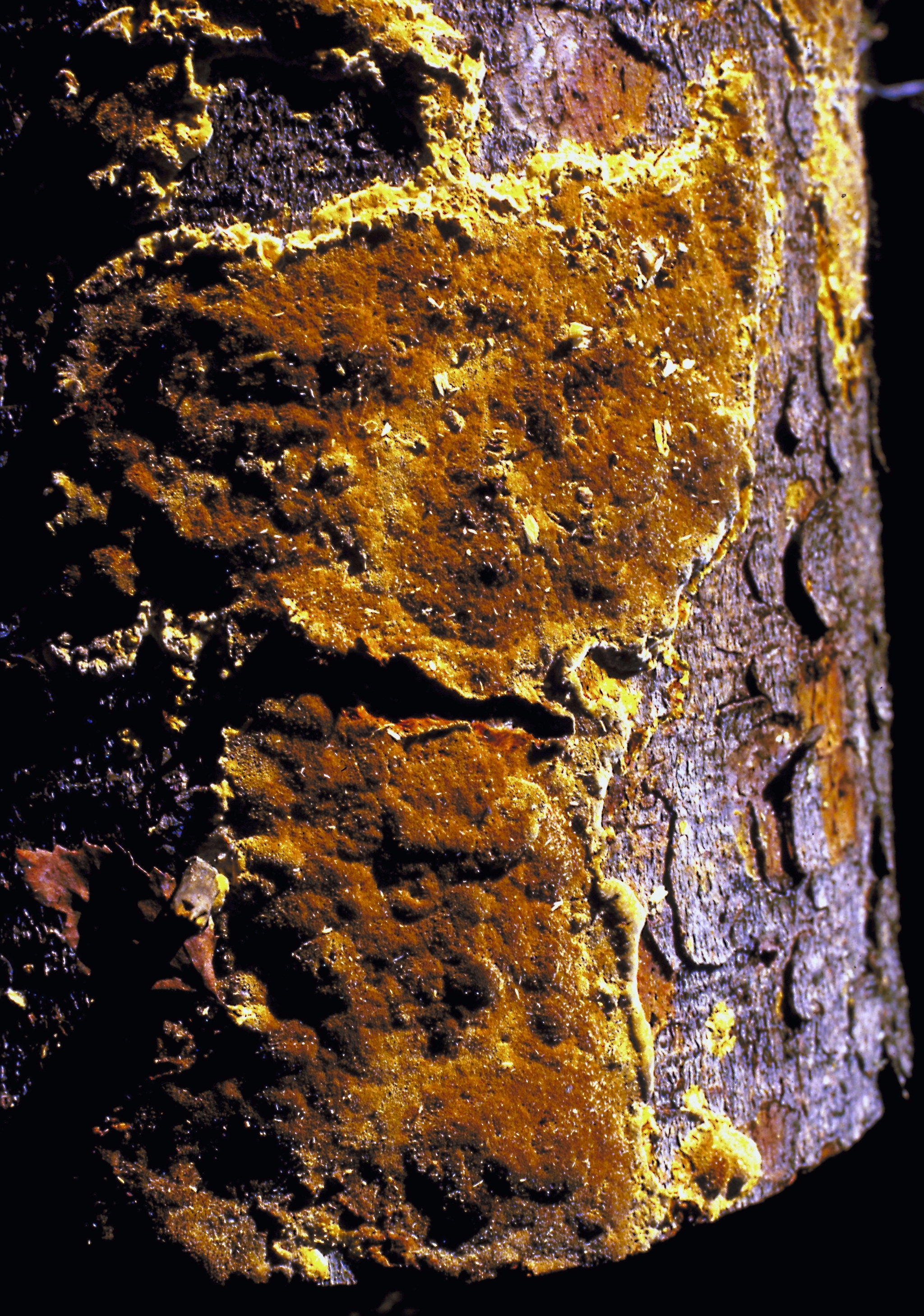
- Fruiting bodies of Phellinus weirii that cause Laminated root rot

Scientific classification
- Domain: Eukaryota
- Kingdom: Fungi
- Division: Basidiomycota
- Class: Agaricomycetes
- Order: Hymenochaetales
- Family: Hymenochaetaceae
- Genus: Phellinus
- Species: P. weirii

Binomial name
- Phellinus weirii

= Laminated root rot =

Fungal plant disease

Laminated root rot also known as yellow ring rot is caused by the fungal pathogen Phellinus weirii. Laminated root rot is one of the most damaging root disease amongst conifers in northwestern America and true firs, Douglas fir, Mountain hemlock, and Western hemlock are highly susceptible to infection with P. weirii. A few species of plants such as Western white pine and Lodgepole pine are tolerant to the pathogen while Ponderosa pine is resistant to it. Only hardwoods are known to be immune to the pathogen.

== Symptoms and signs ==
The disease can infect trees as young as 6 years-old, and infects trees throughout their lifespan. Diagnostic symptoms include crown yellowing and thinning, a distress crop of cones, red brown stained outer heartwood, and laminate decay (decay that separates along annual rings). The disease tends to occur in patches due to a primarily short range spread mechanism. Infected or decayed roots break close to the root collar forming “root balls.” Laminated root rot is frequently detected during ground survey when canopy openings and standing dead and fallen trees are observed. Signs of laminated root rot include the setal hyphae (tiny hairlike hyphae) between sheets of decomposing wood and also buff-colored mycelium on the outside of the roots.

== Discovery ==
The fungus Phellinus weirii was first discovered in 1914, on Western red cedar in Idaho. The first reported instance in Douglas-fir was in 1940, in Cowichan Lake, British Columbia.

== Disease cycle and transmission ==
There are two types of the Phellinus; one that causes laminated root rot in Douglas fir, Grand fir, and Hemlocks and the other that causes butt rot in Western red cedar. The mycelium of this fungus doesn’t grow in the soil and also its spores are not spread by wind like most fungal pathogens. Infection occurs when roots of healthy trees grow in contact with infected roots. After initial contact with a living root, the mycelium grows on the bark, extending only a few millimeters into the surrounding soil. The mycelium penetrates the host through injured bark and advances proximally and distally along newly infected roots. It eventually penetrates through the host’s cambium and grows inside the wood causing decay and death of living cells in the heartwood and sapwood. During this process of entering into the cambium, the pathogen kills the phloem and initiates the decay of the xylem. The pathogen utilizes both cellulose and lignin, weakening the plant and eventually this leads to its death Phellinus Weirii over-winters within infected stumps and can remain viable for up to 50 years It is also known to infect bark, but this infection process is not well understood. Older trees are more resilient to infection, although trees of all ages may be infected.

== Management ==
In all cases of the disease, thorough study of the distribution and intensity should be determined to help choose a management practice that’s cost effective. For example, if the disease is widespread in a pre-commercial stand, destroying the plantation may be the most effective measure. The area can then be replanted with immune or low-susceptible species. Aerial surveying is a viable tool available for use in areas where there are severely damaged systems. Other management tools include:

- Using up to date models to help predict the spread of the disease can help with management choice
- Susceptible species should not be planted within 100 feet of a disease center
- Remove as many infected roots and stumps as possible to avoid inoculation of healthy plants
- Cut all infected trees within the disease center and all uninfected trees within 50 ft of the disease center
- Stumping is an expensive, yet effective measure in gently sloping, high-quality sites with light soils. After an excavator removes the stump, pieces of the root are torn and fragmented so invading soil organisms deter long-term inocula.
- Push-falling is an alternative to post-harvest stumping. Whole trees are pushed over with machinery to expose diseased roots for removal. Push-falling is effective in areas with slopes less than 30 percent and soil textures that are sandy to sandy loam.
- Applications of chemical fumigation (such as chloropicrin) have been unsuccessful in dealing with Laminated root rot.

== Economic importance ==
The trees die from failure to take up water and nutrients because the main roots are decayed. The death is also accelerated by wind that throws the trees down. It is estimated that Laminated root rot reduces timber production by about 4.4 million cubic meters annually. Wood losses in British Columbia are estimated to be 1.4 million cubic meters.
