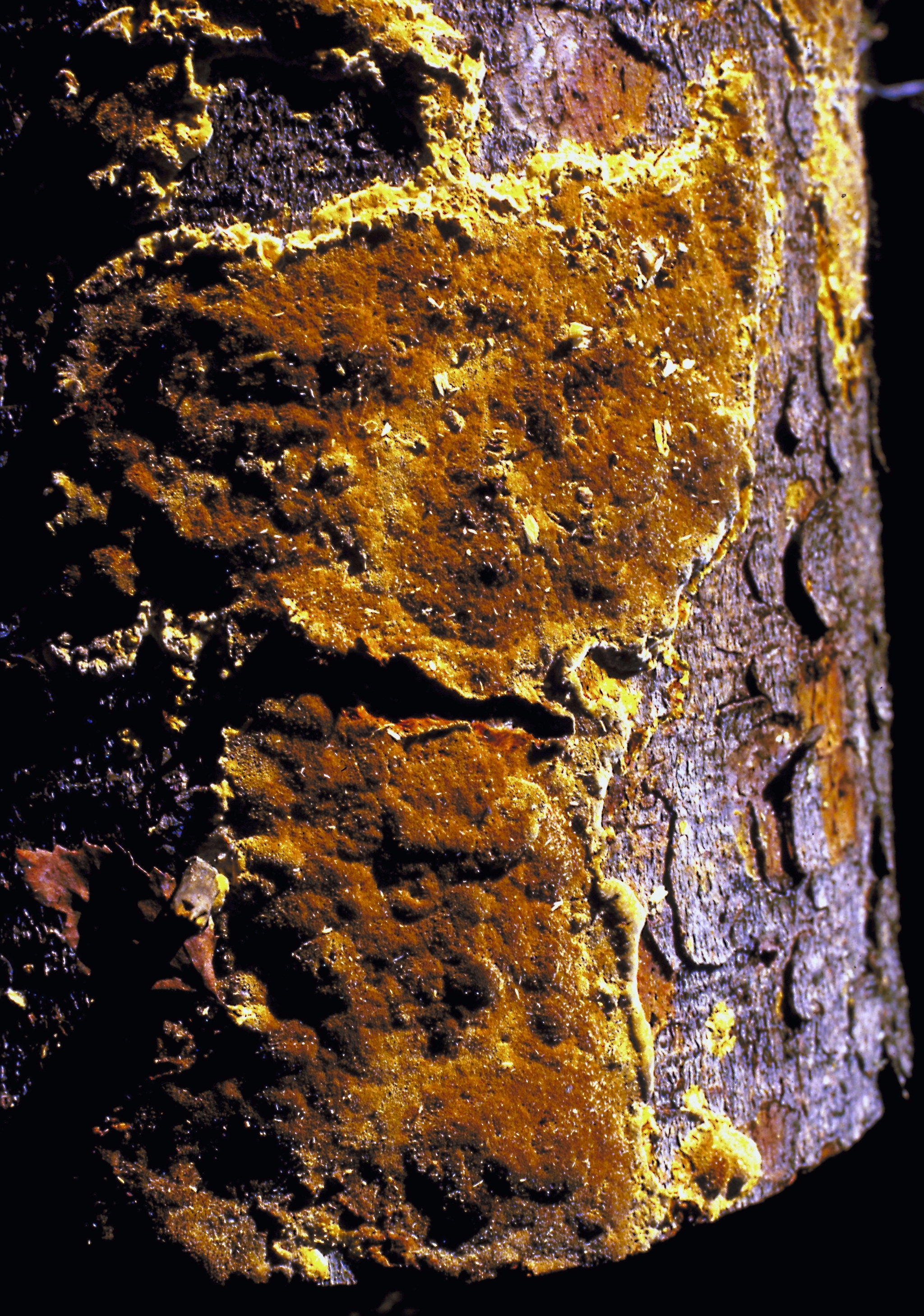
- Fruit bodies

Scientific classification
- Kingdom: Fungi
- Division: Basidiomycota
- Class: Agaricomycetes
- Order: Hymenochaetales
- Family: Hymenochaetaceae
- Genus: Coniferiporia
- Species: C. weirii

Binomial name
- Coniferiporia weirii (Murrill) L.W. Zhou & Y.C. Dai (2016)

Synonyms
- List: Fomitiporia weirii Murrill (1914); Poria weirii (Murrill) Murrill (1914); Fuscoporia weirii (Murrill) Aoshima (1953); Inonotus weirii (Murrill) Kotl. & Pouzar (1970); Phellinidium weirii (Murrill) Y.C.Dai (1995); Phellinus weirii (Murrill) Gilb. (1974)

= Coniferiporia weirii =

Species of fungus

Coniferiporia weirii is a species of fungus. It is a plant pathogen that causes laminated root rot in certain conifers, typically Douglas-fir and western redcedar. It is widespread in the Douglas-fir growing regions of British Columbia, Washington and Oregon.

== Description ==
Coniferiporia weirii root rot is recognized first by the symptoms it induces in its hosts. Reduced terminal growth is usually the first symptom to appear, followed by yellowing (chlorosis) and thinning of crowns. Reduced growth rate is an attribute of tree infection. Particular attention is invited to the growth ring patterns visible in the images below.

== Commercial losses ==
Losses due to the fungus are estimated at 4.4 million m^{3} (157 million ft^{3}) of timber in the Northwestern United States and in British Columbia.

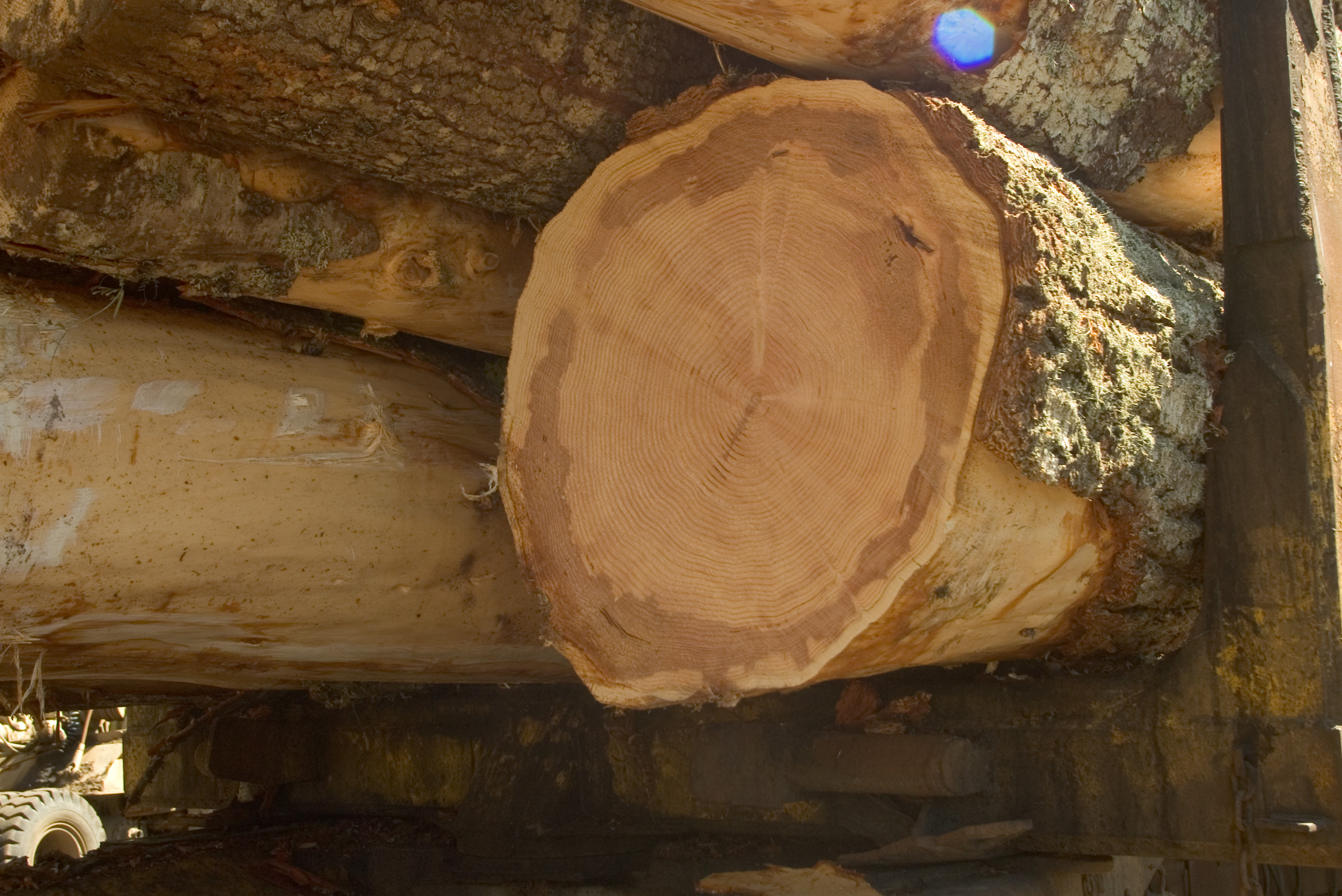
Moderately advanced infection

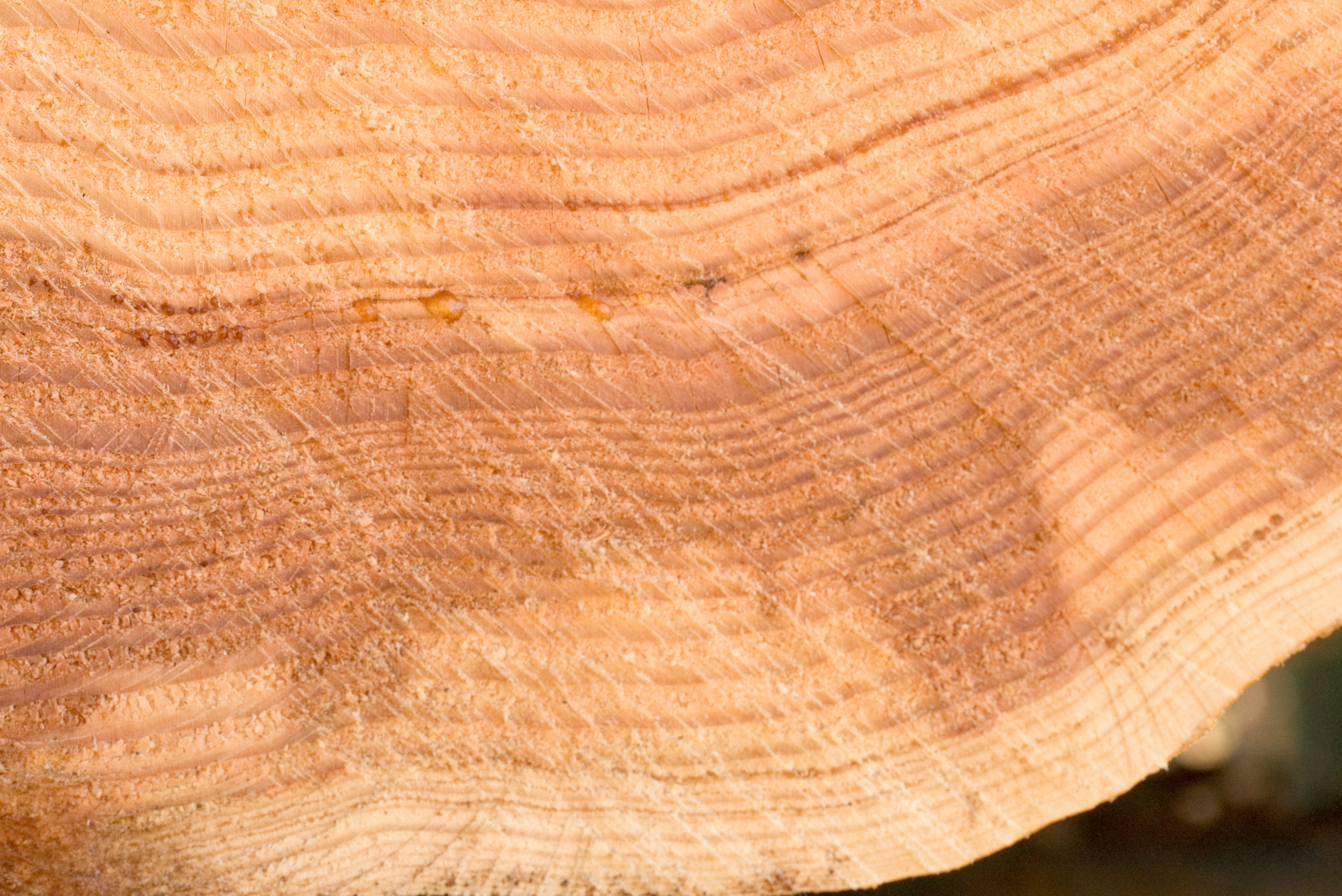
Close up of infection at Apiary, Oregon

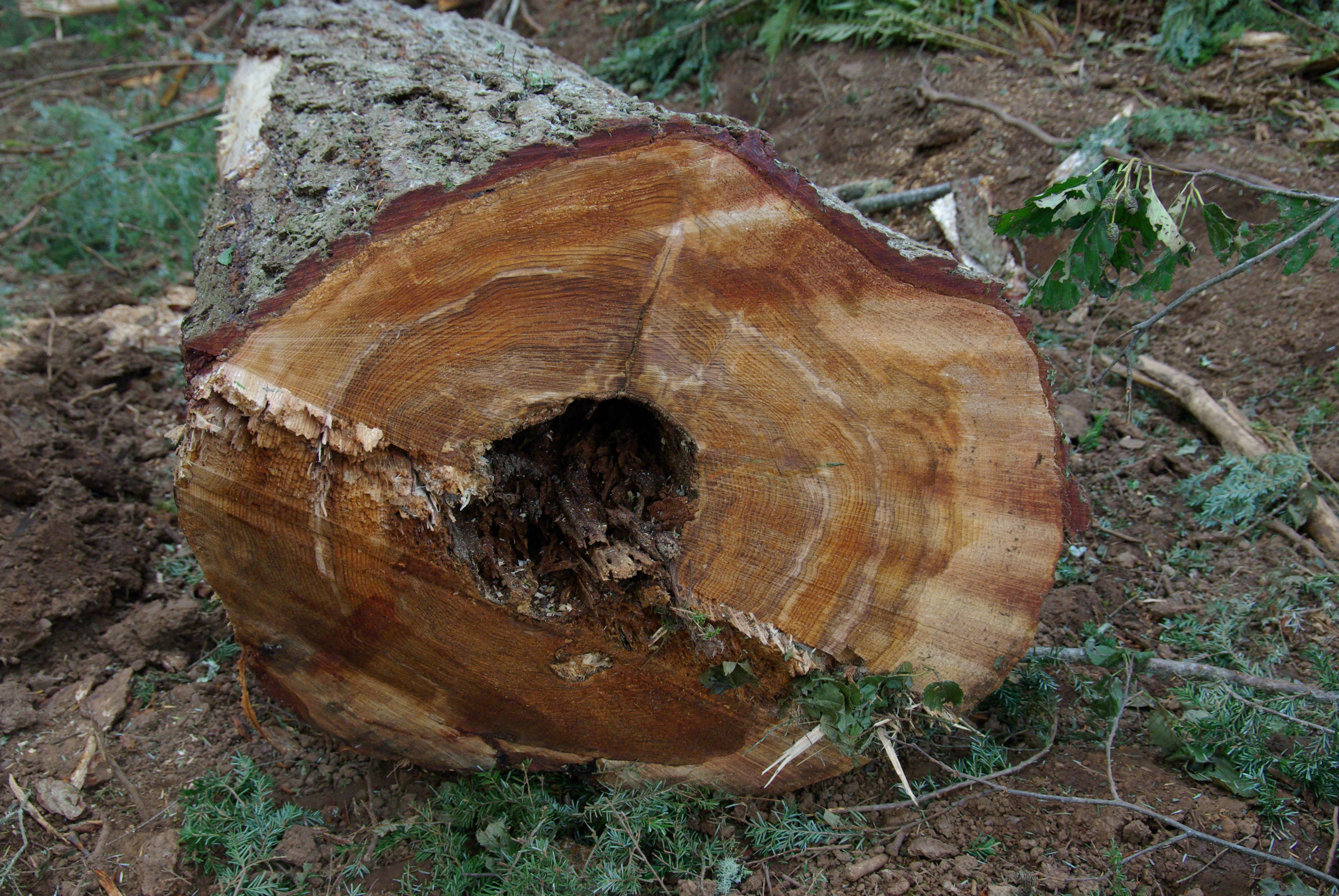
Hollow log at stump level---An extreme case of infection

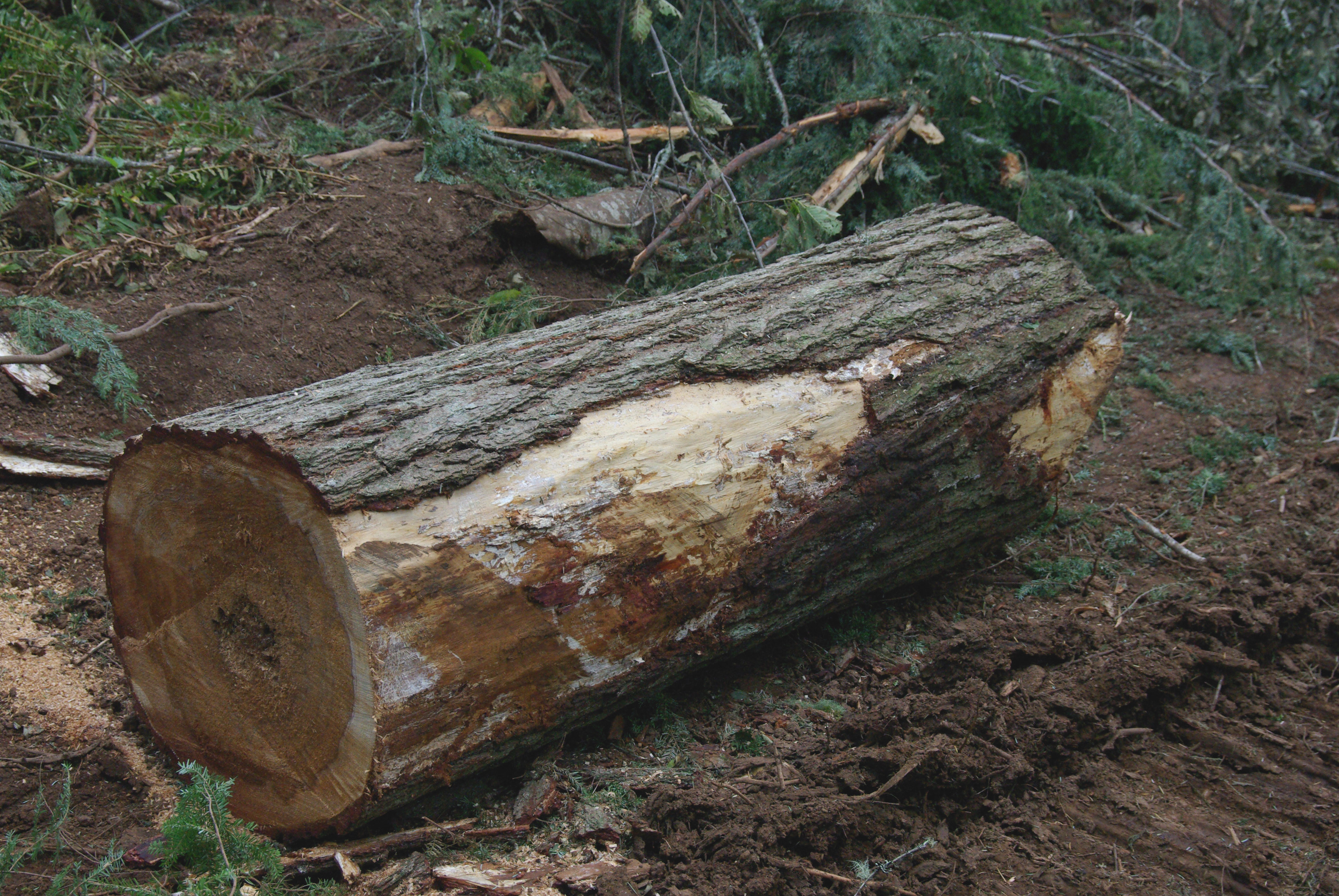
View of long butt showing reduced rot a few feet up from the stump
