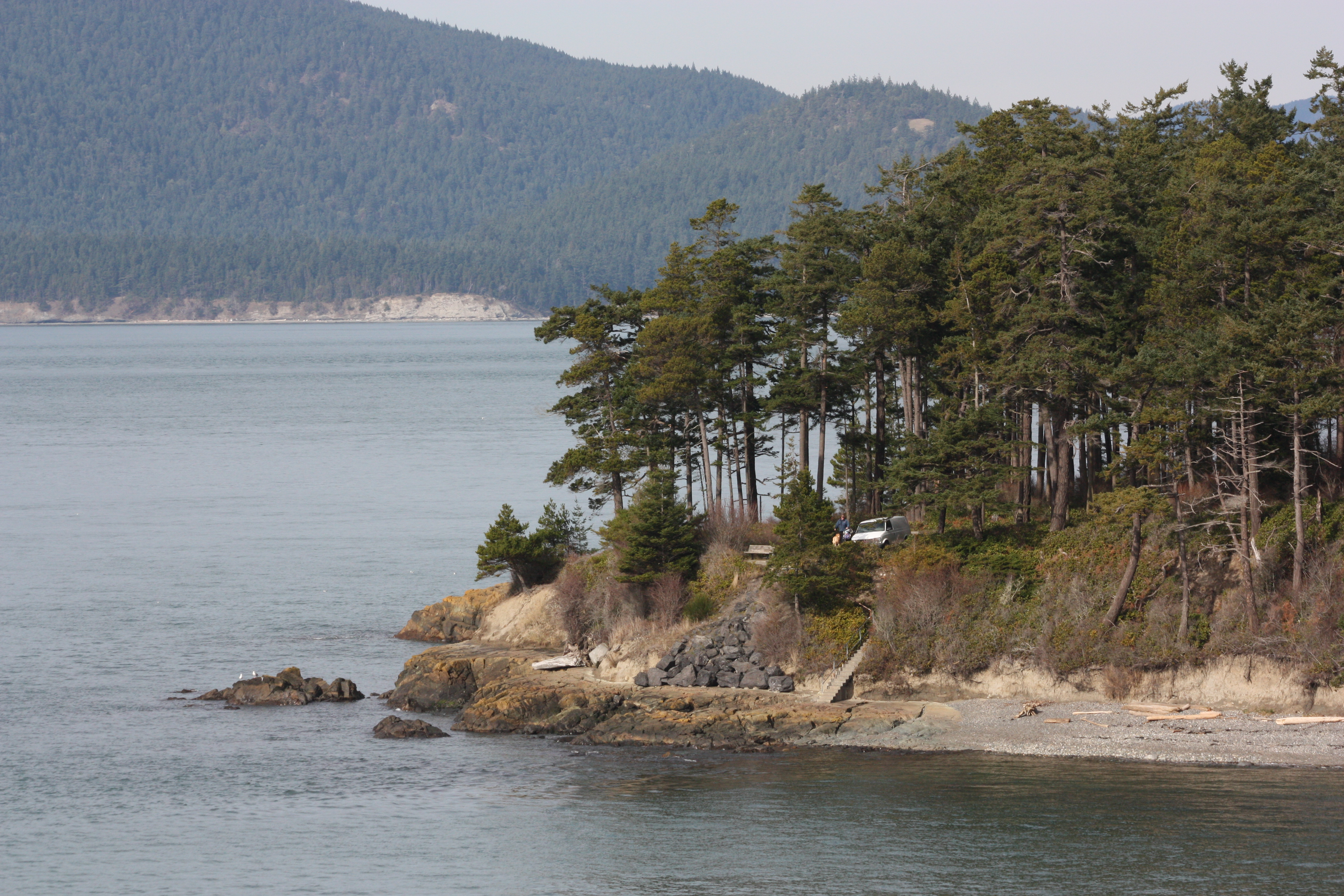

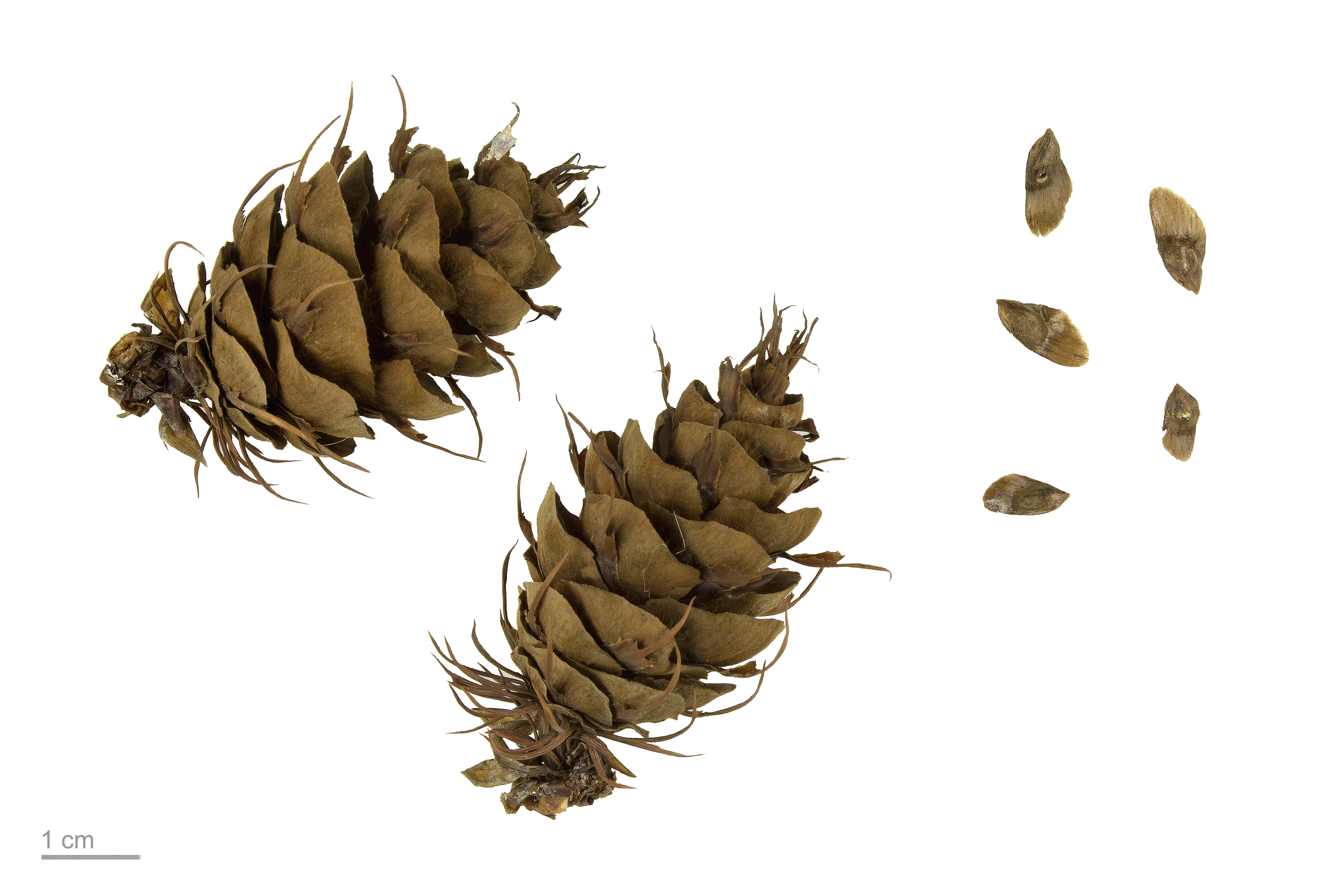

Conservation status
- Least Concern (IUCN 3.1)

- Secure (NatureServe)

Scientific classification
- Kingdom: Plantae
- Clade: Tracheophytes
- Clade: Gymnosperms
- Division: Pinophyta
- Class: Pinopsida
- Order: Pinales
- Family: Pinaceae
- Genus: Pseudotsuga
- Species: P. menziesii

Binomial name
- Pseudotsuga menziesii (Mirbel) Franco
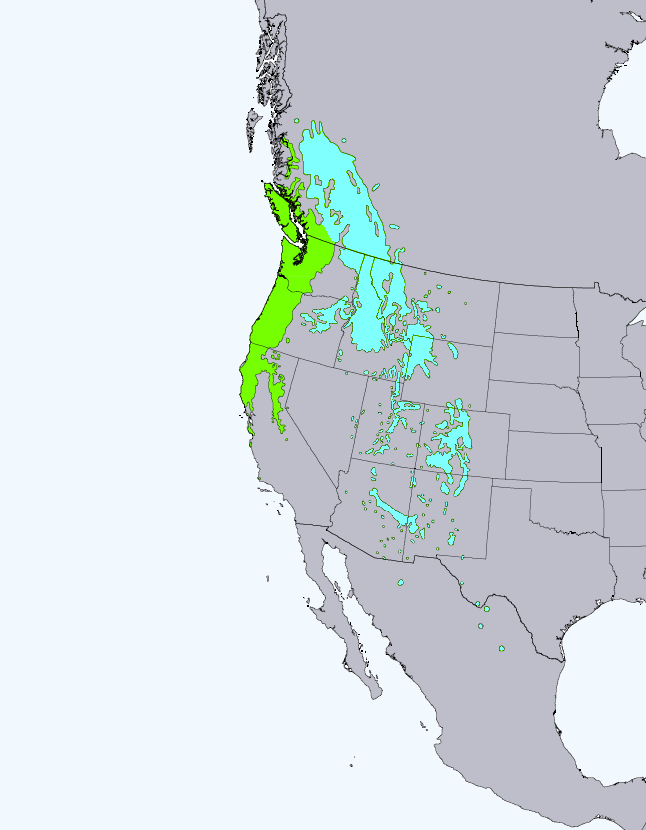
- Green: Coast Douglas-fir (Pseudotsuga menziesii var. menziesii) Blue: Rocky Mountain Douglas-fir (Pseudotsuga menziesii var. glauca)

Synonyms
- Abies menziesii Mirb.; Abies mucronata Raf.; Abies taxifolia Poir.; Pinus douglasii Sabine ex D. Don; Pinus taxifolia Lamb.; Pseudotsuga douglasii (Sabine ex D. Don) Carrière; Pseudotsuga mucronata (Raf.) Sudw.; Pseudotsuga taxifolia Britton; Pseudotsuga taxifolia var. viridis ined.

= Douglas fir =

Species of tree

The Douglas fir (Pseudotsuga menziesii) is a conifer species in the pine family, Pinaceae. It is the tallest tree in the family. It is native to western North America and is also known as Douglas-fir, Douglas spruce, Oregon pine, and Columbian pine. There are three varieties: coast Douglas-fir (P. menziesii var. menziesii), Rocky Mountain Douglas-fir (P. menziesii var. glauca) and Mexican Douglas-fir (P. menziesii var. lindleyana).

Despite its common names, it is not a true fir (genus Abies), spruce (genus Picea), or pine (genus Pinus). It is also not a hemlock (genus Tsuga); the genus name Pseudotsuga means "false hemlock".

== Description ==
Douglas-firs are medium-sized to extremely large trees, 20–100 metres (70–330 feet) tall (although only coast Douglas-firs reach heights near 100 m) and commonly reach 2.4 m (8 ft) in diameter, although trees with diameters of almost 5 m (16 ft) exist. The largest coast Douglas-firs regularly live over 500 years, with the oldest specimens living for over 1,300 years. Rocky Mountain Douglas-firs, found further to the east, are less long-lived, usually not exceeding 400 years in age.

There are records of former coast Douglas-firs exceeding 120 m (390 ft) in height, which if alive today would make it the tallest tree species on Earth. Particular historical specimens with heights exceeding 120 m (400 ft) include the Lynn Valley Tree and the Nooksack Giant.

The leaves are flat, soft, linear needles 1.5–4 cm (1/2–1 1/2 in) long, generally resembling those of the firs, occurring singly rather than in fascicles; they completely encircle the branches, which can be useful in recognizing the species. As the trees grow taller in denser forest, they lose their lower branches, such that the foliage may start as high as 34 m (110 ft) off the ground. Douglas-firs in environments with more light may have branches much closer to the ground.

The bark on young trees is thin, smooth, and gray, and contains numerous resin blisters. On mature trees, usually exceeding 80 years, it is very thick and corky, growing up to 36 cm (14 in) thick with distinctive, deep vertical fissures caused by the gradual expansion of the growing tree. Some of the mature bark is brown, while other parts are lighter colored with a cork-like texture; these develop in multiple layers. This thick bark makes the Douglas-fir one of the most fire-resistant tree native to the Pacific Northwest.

The male cones are yellowish red, 5–12 mm (1/4–1/2 in) long. The female cones are green when young, maturing to reddish-brown or gray, 6–10 cm (2 1/4–4 in) long; they are pendulous, with persistent scales, unlike those of true firs. They have distinctive long, trifid (three-pointed) bracts which protrude prominently above each scale and are said to resemble the back half of a mouse, with two feet and a tail. The seeds are 5 mm (1/4 in) long, with a longer wing.

The massive genome of Douglas-fir was sequenced in 2017 by the large PineRefSeq consortium, revealing a specialized photosynthetic apparatus in the light-harvesting complex of genes.

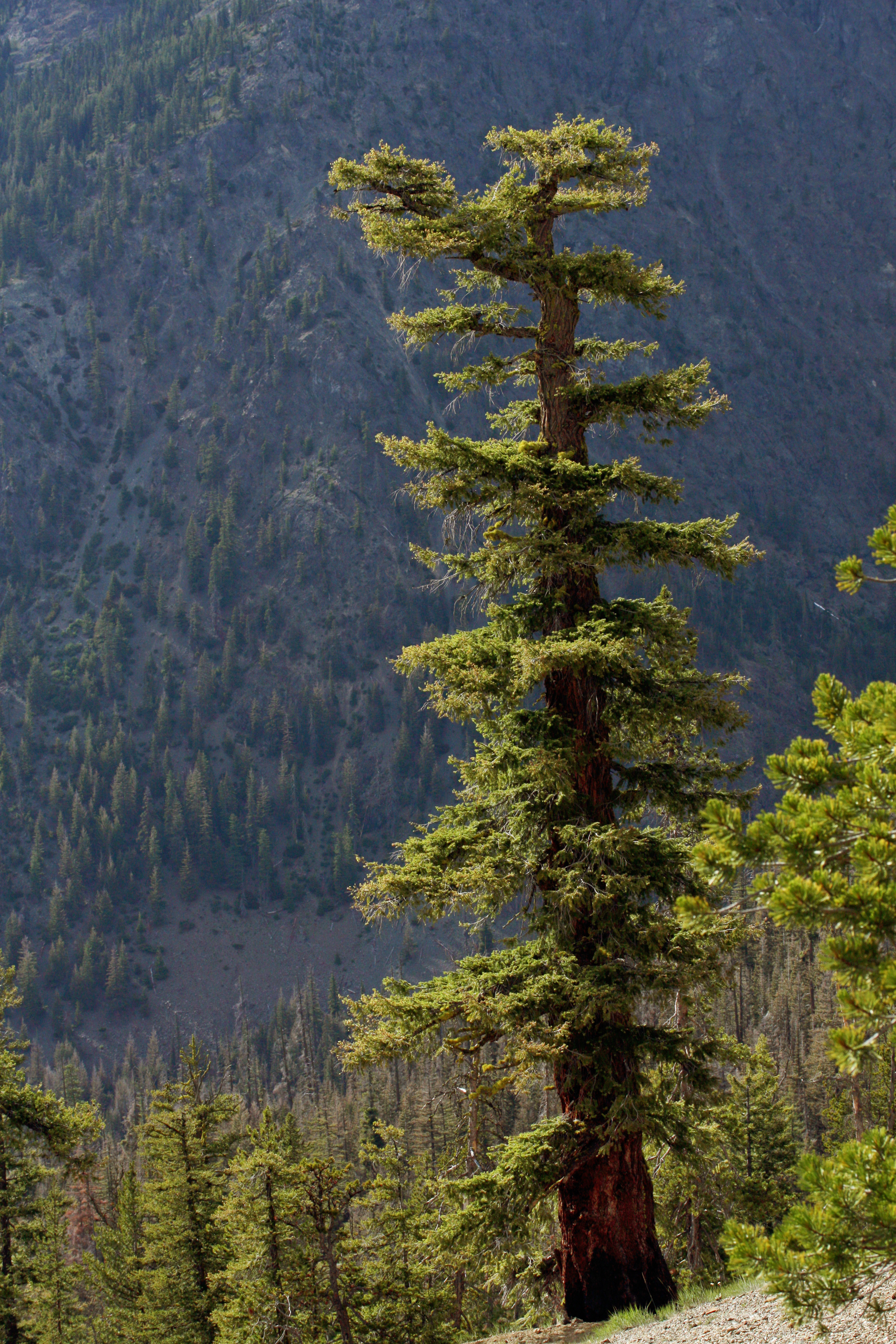
Mature individual in the Wenatchee Mountains

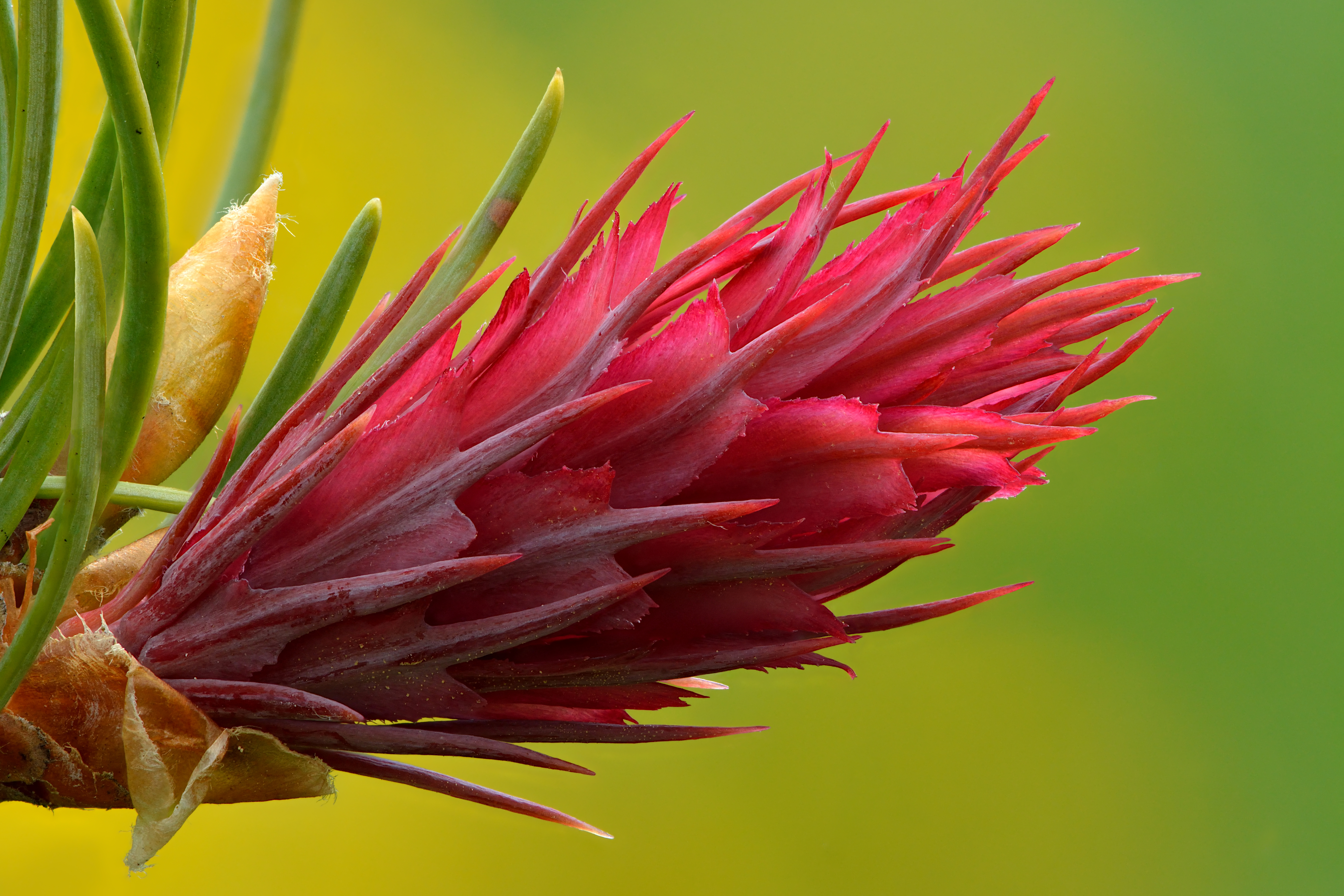
Young female cone

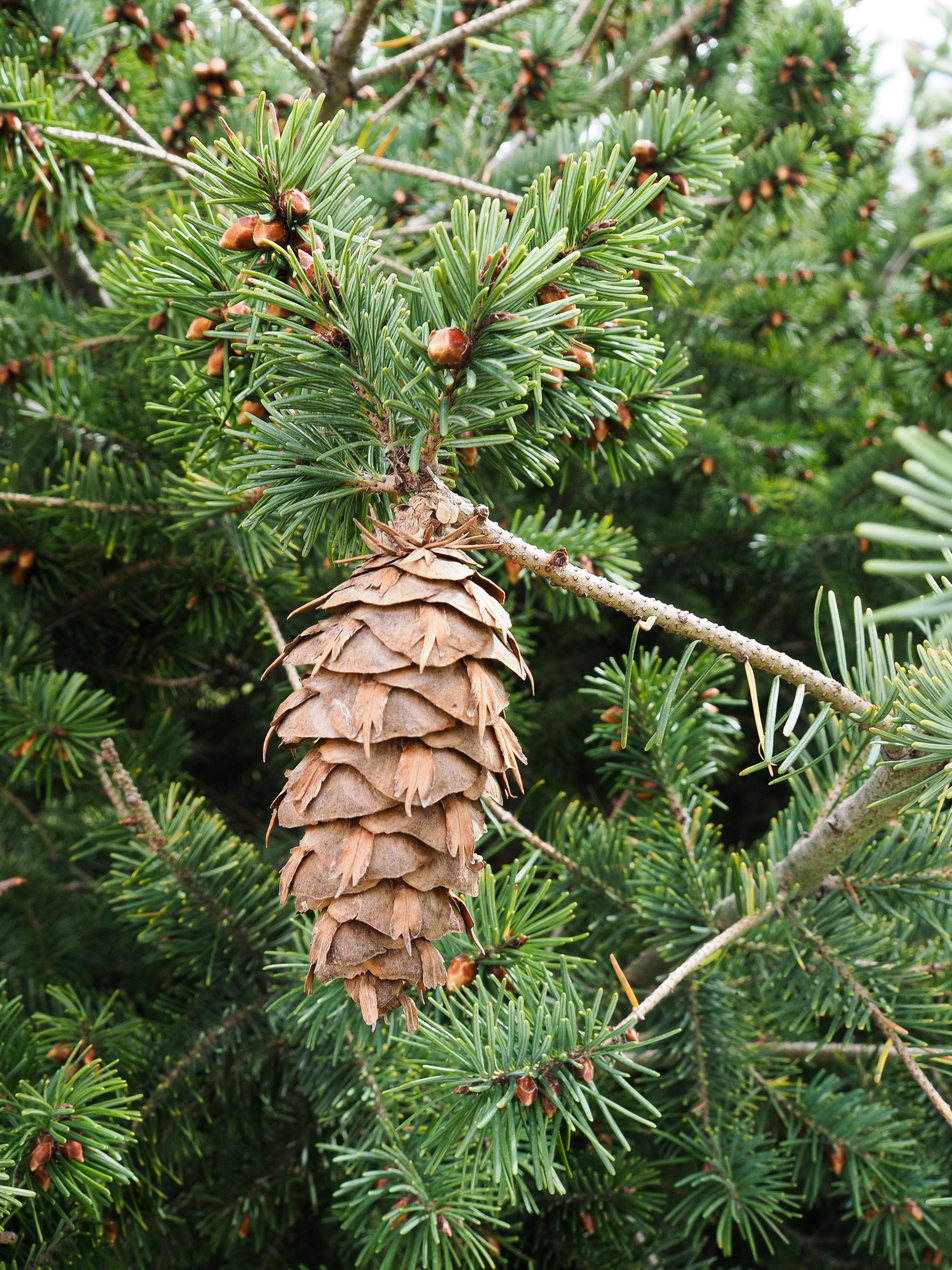
Mature female cone

== Taxonomy ==
The common name honors David Douglas, a Scottish botanist and collector who first reported the extraordinary nature and potential of the species. The common name is misleading since it is not a true fir, i.e., not a member of the genus Abies. For this reason, the name is often written as Douglas-fir (a name also used for the genus Pseudotsuga as a whole).

The specific epithet menziesii is after Archibald Menzies, a Scottish physician and rival naturalist to David Douglas. Menzies first documented the tree on Vancouver Island in 1791. Colloquially, the species is also known simply as Doug fir or Douglas pine (although the latter common name may also refer to Pinus douglasiana). Other names for this tree have included Oregon pine, British Columbian pine, Puget Sound pine, Douglas spruce, false hemlock, red fir, or red pine (although again red pine may refer to a different tree species, Pinus resinosa, and red fir may refer to Abies magnifica).

One Coast Salish name for the tree, used in the Halkomelem language, is lá:yelhp. In the Lushootseed language, the tree is called čəbidac.

== Distribution ==
Pseudotsuga menziesii var. menziesii, the coast Douglas-fir, grows in the coastal regions from west-central British Columbia southward to Central California. In Oregon and Washington, its range is continuous from the eastern edge of the Cascades west to the Pacific Coast Ranges and Pacific Ocean. In California, it is found in the Klamath and California Coast Ranges as far south as the Santa Lucia Range, with a small stand as far south as the Purisima Hills in Santa Barbara County. One of the last remaining old growth stands of conifers is in the Mattole Watershed, and is under threat of logging. In the Sierra Nevada, it ranges as far south as the Yosemite region. It occurs from sea level along the coast to elevations of 1,500 m (4,900 ft) or higher, and inland in some cases up to 2,100 m (6,900 ft).

Another variety exists further inland, Pseudotsuga menziesii var. glauca, the Rocky Mountain Douglas-fir or interior Douglas-fir. Interior Douglas-fir intergrades with coast Douglas-fir in the Cascades of northern Washington and southern British Columbia, and from there ranges northward to central British Columbia and southeastward to the Mexican border, becoming increasingly disjunct as latitude decreases and altitude increases. Mexican Douglas-fir (P. lindleyana), which ranges as far south as Oaxaca, is often considered a variety of P. menziesii.

Fossils (wood, pollen) of Pseudotsuga are recorded from the Miocene and Pliocene of Europe (Siebengebirge, Gleiwitz, Austria).

It is also naturalised throughout Europe, Argentina and Chile (called Pino Oregón). In New Zealand it is considered to be an invasive species, called a wilding conifer, and is subject to control measures. But is also one of the most common lumber trees used in forestry alongside Radiata pine with large plantations throughout the country. The species was introduced in the 20th century for its wood.

== Ecology ==
=== Preferred sites ===
Douglas-fir prefers acidic or neutral soils, such as Olympic soil. However, it exhibits considerable morphological plasticity, and on drier sites P. menziesii var. menziesii will generate deeper taproots. Pseudotsuga menziesii var. glauca exhibits even greater plasticity, occurring in stands of interior temperate rainforest in British Columbia, as well as at the edge of semi-arid sagebrush steppe throughout much of its range, where it generates even deeper taproots still.

The coast Douglas-fir variety is the dominant tree west of the Cascade Mountains in the Pacific Northwest. It occurs in nearly all forest types and competes well on most parent materials, aspects, and slopes. Adapted to a more moist, mild climate than the interior subspecies, it grows larger and faster than Rocky Mountain Douglas-fir. Associated trees include western hemlock, Sitka spruce, sugar pine, western white pine, ponderosa pine, grand fir, coast redwood, western redcedar, California incense-cedar, Lawson's cypress, tanoak, bigleaf maple and several others. Pure stands are also common, particularly north of the Umpqua River in Oregon. It is most dominant in areas with a more frequent fire regime that suppresses less fire-resistant conifers.

=== Use by animals ===
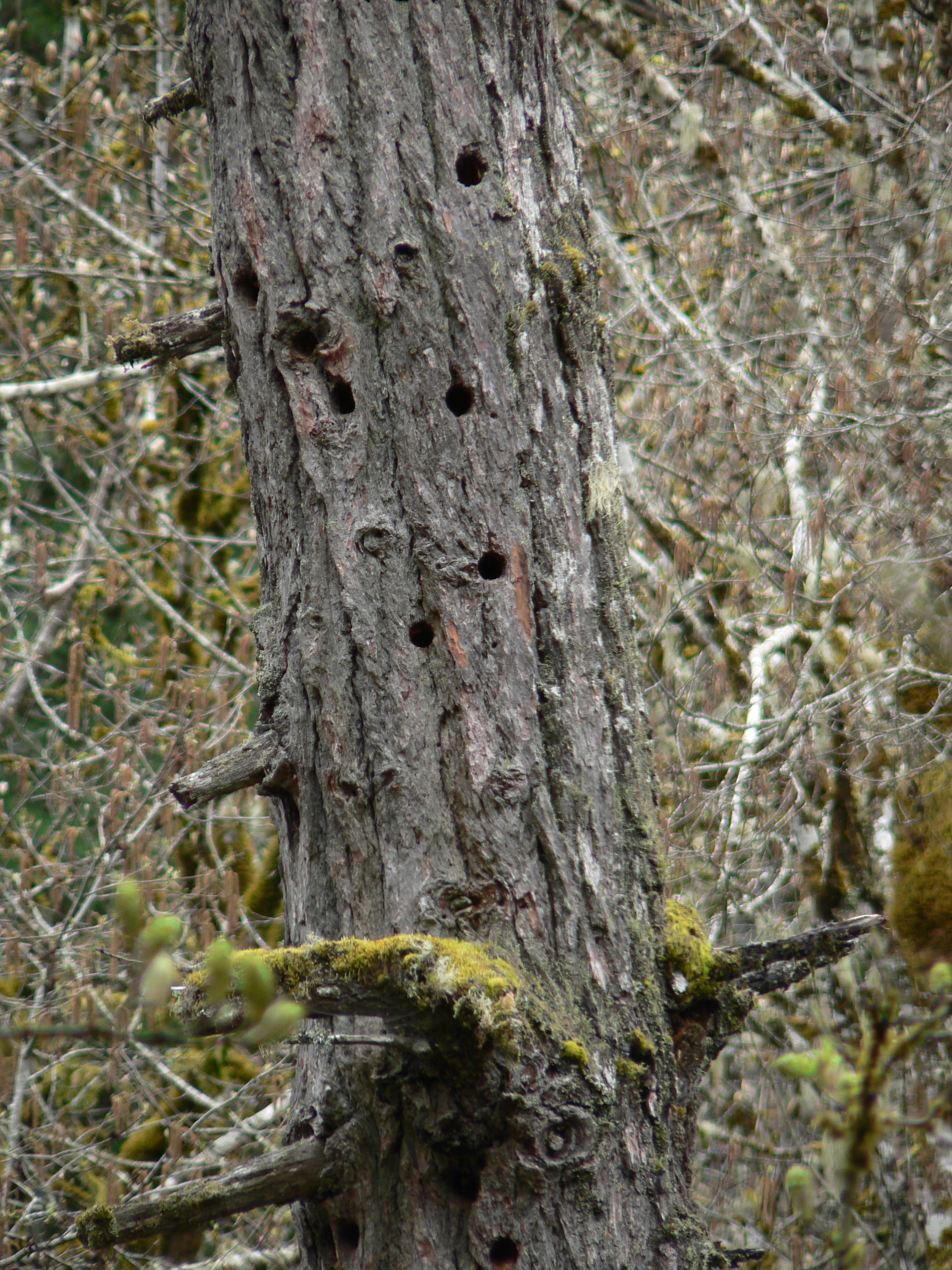
A snag provides nest cavities for birds.

Douglas-fir seeds are an extremely important food source for small mammals such as moles, shrews, and chipmunks, which consume an estimated 65% of each annual seed crop. The Douglas squirrel harvests and hoards great quantities of Douglas-fir cones, and also consumes mature pollen cones, the inner bark, terminal shoots, and developing young needles.

Mature or "old-growth" Douglas-fir forest is the primary habitat of the red tree vole (Arborimus longicaudus) and the spotted owl (Strix occidentalis). Home range requirements for breeding pairs of spotted owls are at least 400 hectares (4.0 km^{2}; 990 acres) of old growth. Red tree voles may also be found in immature forests if Douglas-fir with sufficient canopy structure is a significant component. The red tree vole nests almost exclusively on branches or in the trunks of the trees, typically 2–50 metres (5–165 ft) above the ground, and its diet consists chiefly of Douglas-fir needles.

Douglas-fir needles are generally poor browse for ungulates, although in the winter when other food sources are lacking it can become important, and black-tailed deer browse new seedlings and saplings in spring and summer. The spring diet of the blue grouse features Douglas-fir needles prominently.

The leaves are also used by the woolly conifer aphid Adelges cooleyi; this 0.5 mm-long sap-sucking insect is conspicuous on the undersides of the leaves by the small white "fluff spots" of protective wax that it produces. It is often present in large numbers, and can cause the foliage to turn yellowish from the damage it causes. Exceptionally, trees may be partially defoliated by it, but the damage is rarely this severe. Among Lepidoptera, apart from some that feed on Pseudotsuga in general, the gelechiid moths Chionodes abella and C. periculella as well as the cone scale-eating tortrix moth Cydia illutana have been recorded specifically on P. menziesii.

The inner bark is the primary winter food for the North American porcupine.

Poriol is a flavanone, a type of flavonoid, produced by P. menziesii in reaction to infection by Poria weirii.

=== Value to other plants ===
A parasitic plant which uses P. menziesii is the Douglas-fir dwarf mistletoe (Arceuthobium douglasii). Epiphytes such as crustose lichens and mosses are common sights on Douglas-firs. As it is only moderately shade tolerant, undisturbed Douglas-fir stands in humid areas will eventually give way to later successional, more shade-tolerant associates such as the western redcedar and western hemlock—though this process may take a thousand years or more. It is more shade tolerant than some associated fire-dependent species, such as western larch and ponderosa pine, and often replaces these species further inland.

=== Diseases and insects ===
Fungal diseases such as laminated root rot and shoestring root-rot can cause significant damage, and in plantation settings dominated by Douglas-fir monocultures may cause extreme damage to vast swathes of trees. In Austria, Diplodia tip blight was reported to affect Douglas fir provenances. Interplanting with resistant or nonhost species such as western redcedar and beaked hazelnut can reduce this risk. Other threats to Douglas-fir include red ring rot and the Douglas-fir beetle.

=== Endophytes ===
Through association with fungal endophytes, the root and shoot structures of Douglas-fir saplings in low-nutrient conditions have been shown to be elongated, as well as undergo overall biomass increases. The proposed mechanisms behind this include high inorganic phosphate solubilization ability by the fungi as well as organic phosphate mineralization, increased mycorrhizal associations through root colonization, and enhanced nitrogen and phosphorus uptake.

== Uses ==
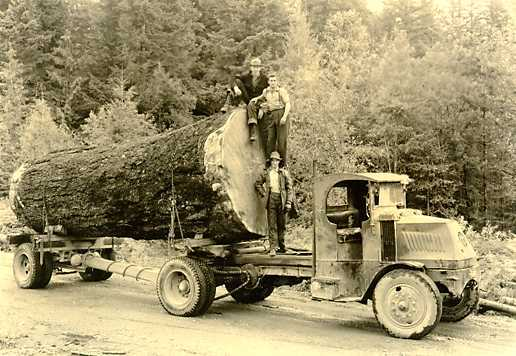
A 2.7 m (9 ft) log, scaling over 7,000 board feet (16,5 cubic meters) of timber, c. 1937

Many different Native American groups use the bark, resin, and needles to make herbal treatments for various diseases. Historically, Native Hawaiians built waʻa kaulua (double-hulled canoes) from coast Douglas-fir logs that had drifted ashore. The wood and bark have historically been favored as firewood, especially from the coastal variety. Additionally, Douglas-fir has long been used as a building material by both Native American groups and settlers.

The species is extensively used in forestry management as a plantation tree for softwood timber. Douglas-fir is one of the world's best timber-producing species and yields more timber than any other species in North America, making the forestlands of western Oregon, Washington, and British Columbia the most productive on the continent. In 2011, Douglas-fir represented 34.2% of US lumber exports, to a total of 1.053 billion board feet (2,484,803,3 cubic meters). Douglas-fir timber is used for timber frame construction and timber trusses using traditional joinery, veneer, and flooring due to its strength, hardness and durability. As of 2024, the only wooden ships still currently in use by the U.S. Navy in conventional naval operations are Avenger-class minesweepers, made of Douglas-fir.

Douglas-fir sees wide use in heavy timber structures, as its wood is strong, available in a number of specifications including kiln dried and grade stamped, and can be supplied in very long lengths to 18 m (60 ft). West coast mills are sophisticated in their processing of timbers, making lead times predictable and availability reliable. Paints adhere well to Douglas-fir. Stains perform well on Douglas-fir timbers with the mild caution that the natural color of this species varies and care must be taken to ensure uniformity of color. Pitch pockets that may ooze resin can be present in timbers that have not been kiln dried. Because of the timber sizes available, stamped timber grading, and relatively short lead times, Douglas-fir sees wide use in both public and residential projects.

The species has ornamental value in large parks and gardens. It has been commonly used as a Christmas tree since the 1920s, and the trees are typically grown on plantations.

The buds have been used to flavor eau de vie, a clear, colorless fruit brandy. Douglas-fir pine leaves can be used to make pine needle tea. They possess a tangy citrus flavor and may serve in some recipes as a wild substitute for rosemary.

== Notable examples ==
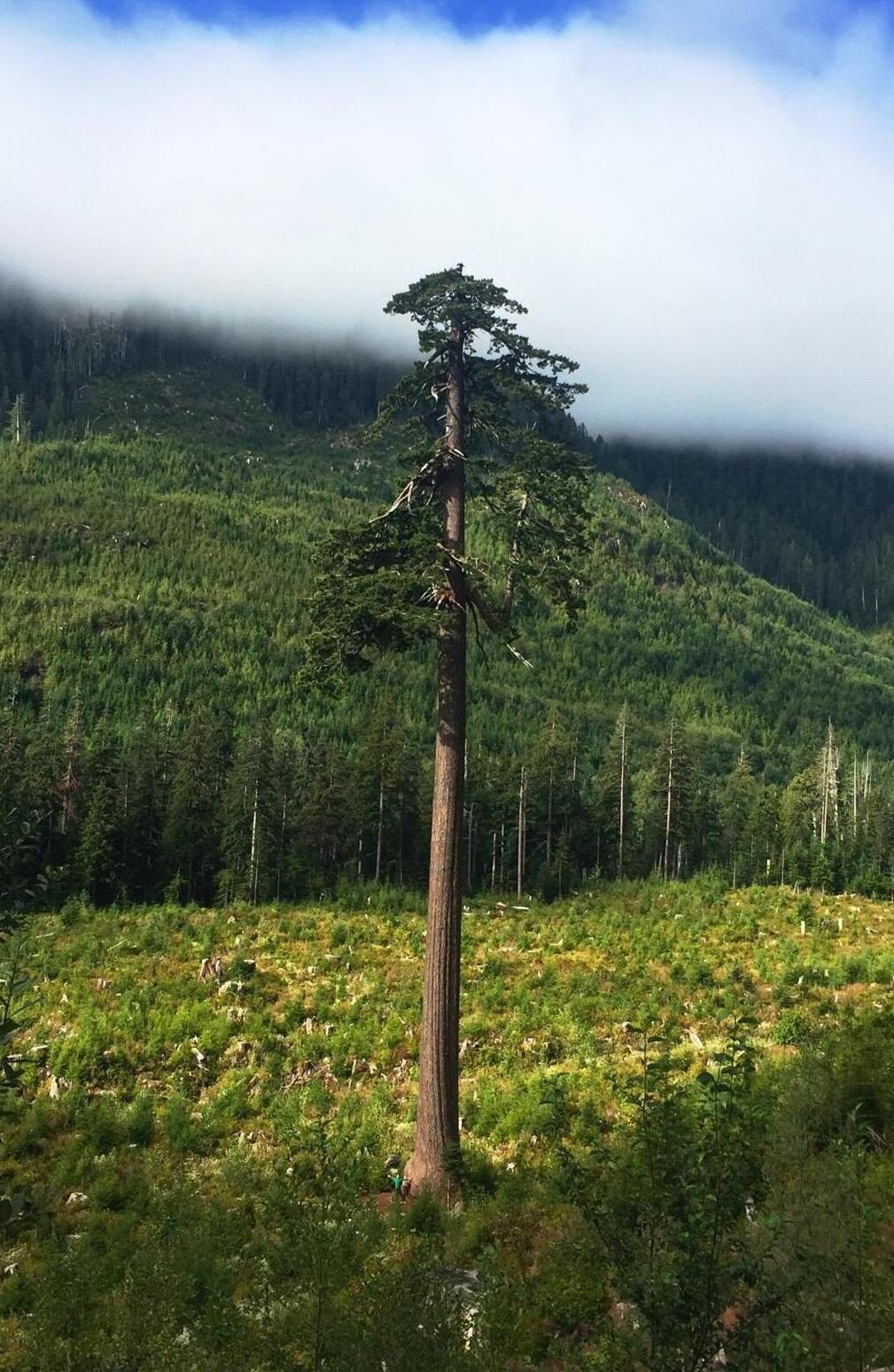
Big Lonely Doug, 2018, with person at base for scale

The immense size and long lifespan of the Douglas fir has produced some acclaimed individual trees. Historical examples include the Lynn Valley Tree near Vancouver, British Columbia and the Nooksack Giant in Maple Falls in Washington State.

Living examples in Canada include the Red Creek Fir in the San Juan Valley of Vancouver Island, the largest known Douglas-fir in Canada and one of the largest in the world; the Bonin Giant in the Coquitlam River watershed in British Columbia's Lower Mainland and Big Lonely Doug north of Port Renfrew on Vancouver Island.

American examples include the Lake Quinault Douglas fir in the Olympic National Forest, Washington State, the largest known Douglas fir in the United States; the Grandma Tree in North Fork Coquille River in Oregon, the second greatest of a living Douglas fir in the United States.; the Queets Fir, in the Olympic National Park in Washington State with the largest known in diameter; and the Doerner Fir fir in Coos County, Oregon.

Outside of North America, the Hermitage Douglas-fir in Dunkeld, Scotland was one of the tallest trees in the United Kingdom until it fell in 2017 and the Waldtraut of the mill forest, in Freiburg im Breisgau is the tallest tree in Germany.

== See also ==
- List of Douglas-fir species
- List of Douglas-fir diseases
- List of superlative trees
