= Demineralisation =

Demineralisation or demineralization may refer to:

- Demineralization (physiology)
  - Bone demineralisation leading to osteoporosis; see Bone mineralization
  - Tooth demineralisation that leads to dental caries; see Remineralisation of teeth
- Demineralizing (silk worm cocoon)

== See also ==
- Deionization
- Desalination
- Mineralization (disambiguation)
- Remineralization (disambiguation)
