= Queets Fir =

Large Douglas fir in Washington state

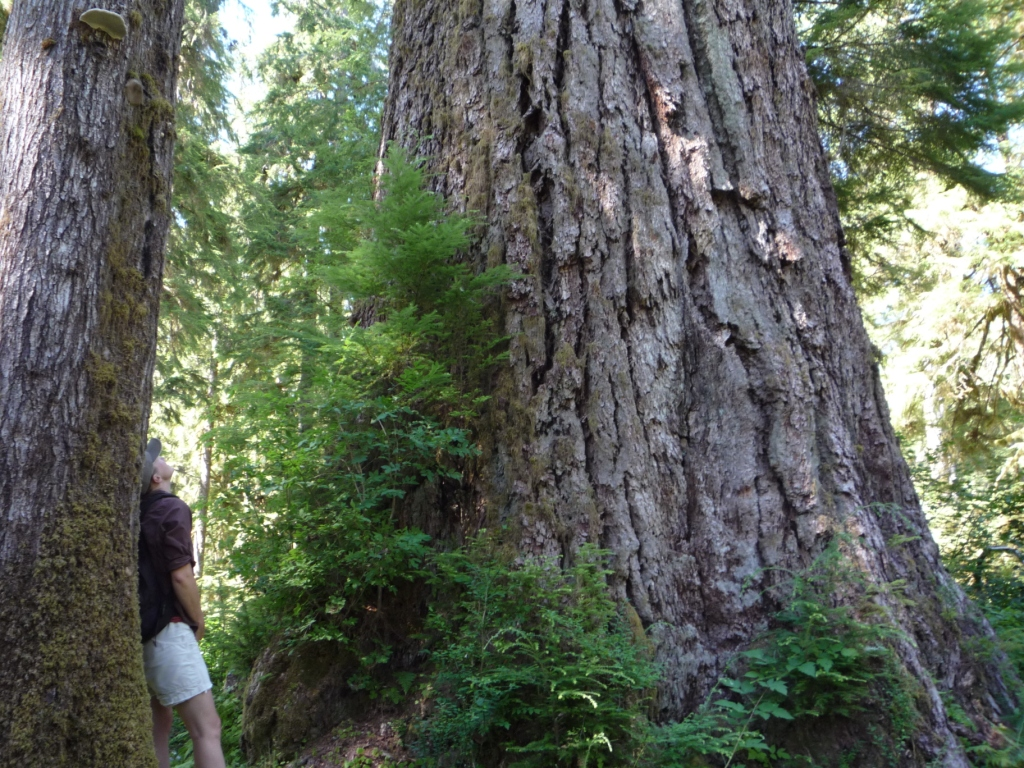
- The Queets Fir in 2010
- Interactive map of Queets Fir
- Species: Coast Douglas fir (Pseudotsuga menziesii var. menziesii)
- Coordinates: 47.6381°N 123.9755°W
- Height: 200 ft (61 m)
- Diameter: 15.9 ft (4.8 m)
- Volume of trunk: 332 m^{3} (11,710 cu ft)

The Queets Fir is a superlative Douglas fir about 2.5 miles from the Queets River Trail trailhead, on Coal Creek, a tributary of Queets River in the Olympic National Park in Washington State. It was known for fifty years, beginning in 1945, as the largest known fir by volume, and is still largest known in diameter. It has a height of at least 200 feet (61 m), circumference 600 inches (1,500 cm), and spread of 71 feet (22 m). It was listed as national co-champion Douglas fir by American Forests, and one of only a handful of "undisputed megatrees" in North America with over 800 points.
