= Grandma Tree =

Douglas fir in the U.S. state of Oregon

Coordinates: 43.080°N 124.141°W

- Interactive map of Grandma Tree
- Species: Douglas fir (Pseudotsuga menziesii)
- Location: Coos County, Oregon
- Girth: 10 metres (33 ft)
- Diameter: 10 feet 5 inches (3.18 m)
- Date seeded: 900 ±400 years

Grandma Tree is a record setting Douglas fir in Oregon. The tree sits near North Fork Coquille River in Coos County. The tree's girth of c. 10 meters (33 ft) is the second greatest of a living Douglas fir in the United States.
