= Remineralization (disambiguation) =

Remineralisation (UK spelling; US remineralization) is the transformation of organic molecules to inorganic forms.

Remineralisation may also refer to:

- Bone remodeling (bone metabolism)
  - Remineralisation of teeth
- Rockdust, also known as soil remineralization when applied as a nonsynthetic organic fertilizer
  - See also John D. Hamaker § Remineralization benefits

== See also ==
- Demineralisation
- Mineralization (disambiguation)
