= Lynn Valley Tree =

One of the tallest known Coast Douglas-fir trees

Coordinates: 49.340725°N 123.038607°W

- Interactive map of Lynn Valley Tree
- Species: Douglas fir (Pseudotsuga menziesii var. menziesii)
- Location: Lynn Valley, Vancouver, British Columbia, Canada
- Height: 126.5 metres (415 ft)
- Diameter: 4.34 metres (14.2 ft)
- Date felled: 1902

The Lynn Valley Tree was one of the tallest known Coast Douglas-fir (Pseudotsuga menziesii var. menziesii), at a measured height of 126.5 metres (415 ft). It was cut down by the Tremblay Brothers, at Argyle Road in 1902 on the property of Alfred John Nye in Lynn Valley, now part of metropolitan Vancouver, BC. In 1912, Alfred Nye told historian Walter Mackay Draycott that the tree had first drawn his attention because of its vast columnar bole, and that it towered above the neighbouring forest. After it was felled, Nye told Draycott he had measured its length at 125 metres (410 ft), with a remaining stump height of 1.52 metres (5 ft 0 in) where its diameter was 4.34 metres (14.2 ft) across the butt, and the bark was 34 centimetres (13.5 in) thick. Since that time, in the lower valley where the tree grew, the entire old-growth forest has been logged, including a nearby 4.24-metre (13.9 ft) diameter fir tree that contained 1,280 rings, and another fir tree felled in the same valley that was said to have measured 107.3 metres (352 ft) tall.

It was one of the tallest trees ever recorded on the planet, exceeded only by a small number of Australian mountain ash (Eucalyptus regnans) other Douglas firs, and perhaps several historic Coast Redwood. In addition, a giant sequoia known as the Father of the Forest from Calaveras grove reportedly measured 133 metres (436 ft) after it fell many centuries ago. However, Douglas firs seem to have more routinely reached such heights in the past, with anecdotal reports of 110 metres (360 ft) to over 120 metres (390 ft)-tall trees being relatively numerous in old records.

Despite measurements of such size being generally considered unreliable, there is a reliable record of a Douglas fir exceeding 140 metres (460 ft) in height: the Nooksack Giant was measured at 142 metres (466 ft) tall with a tape after the tree was cut down in the 19th century.

Both of these heights are close to or, in the latter case, exceed the maximum height a tree can attain as calculated by some theorists, or just within the upper limits according to other theorists. Given widespread reports that trees have been measured after felling as exceeding this maximum height, it lends some credibility to the idea that extremely tall trees growing in especially foggy environments are able to reverse the transpiration stream inside them and maintain adequate water supply to parts of the tree above that height.

There are no known surviving photographs of the Lynn Valley Tree.

== See also ==
- List of tallest trees
