= Lake Quinault Douglas fir =

Tree in Olympic National Forest, Washington

The Lake Quinault Fir is a superlative Douglas fir on Lake Quinault in Olympic National Forest, Washington state. It was designated the champion of its species and the largest known Douglas fir in the United States by American Forests in 2018. The 2018 data from American Forests shows the tree as 581 inches (1,480 cm) in circumference, 293.67 feet (89.51 m) tall, and having a crown spread of 66.25 feet (20.19 m).

The Quinault Valley, where the tree lives, also holds the largest known Sitka Spruce and Mountain Hemlock.
