= Mineralization =

Mineralization may refer to:

- Biomineralization (mineralization in biology), when an inorganic substance precipitates in an organic matrix
  - Mineralized tissues are tissues that have undergone mineralization, including bones, teeth, antlers, and marine shells
    - Bone remodeling, involving demineralization and remineralization in bones
      - Ossification (osteogenesis), mineralization of bone
- Mineralization (geology), the hydrothermal deposition of economically important metals in the formation of ore bodies or lodes
- Mineralization (soil science), the release of plant-available compounds such as ammonium during decomposition

== See also ==
- Demineralisation (disambiguation)
- Petrifaction/petrification
- Remineralization (disambiguation)
  - Remineralisation of teeth (including de- and remineralization of teeth as an ongoing process)
