= Nooksack Giant =

Tallest tree ever recorded

Coordinates: 48.928344°N 122.048887°W

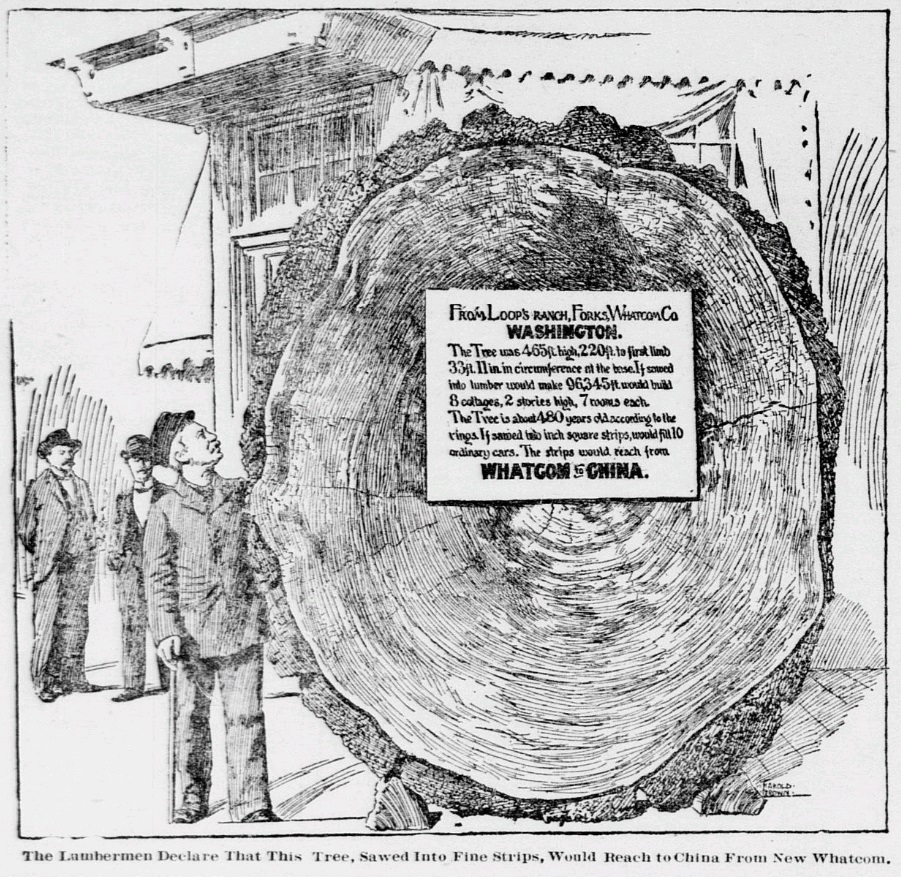
Nooksack Giant depicted after felling, in The Morning Times, February 28, 1897

The Nooksack Giant was a superlative Coast Douglas-fir (Pseudotsuga menziesii var. menziesii) that grew at Loop's Ranch (now Alpenglow Farm) in Maple Falls in Washington State. It was felled in early 1896 on the Alfred Bruce Loop Homestead with a crosscut saw by a team of men at the North Fork of the Nooksack river. The tree was measured with a tape after felling at 465 feet (142 m) in length, 33 ft 11 in (10.3 m) in circumference, or nearly 11 feet (3.4 m) in diameter at the base, and measured 220 feet (67 m) to the first limb. Ring count showed this tree to be 480 years old. A cross section of the tree was displayed on the corner of Railroad Avenue and Holly Street in New Whatcom (now Bellingham) with a wooden placard nailed to it noting the particulars of the tree. Several photographs and photo engravings were taken of the tree's cross section while it was displayed for several years after its cutting, which are on file in the Whatcom County Museum, and in digitally archived news reports and lumber journals. The history of this largely forgotten tree gained a modern resurgence with its re-discovery in digital archives in 2009 by Micah Ewers, an amateur big-tree researcher who had found references to it and 100 other historical Douglas-fir trees in Puget Sound reportedly over 350 to 400 feet (110 to 120 m) tall in the 1890s-1920s. Seattle Times Columnist Ron C. Judd dubbed the tree the "Nooksack Giant" in his 2011 article, where he interviewed both Ewers and Bill Devine, current owner of the Alfred Loop Homestead.

The height of 465 feet (142 m) would make the Nooksack Giant easily the tallest tree ever reliably recorded on the planet. Anecdotal reports do exist of other Douglas fir and mountain ash trees reaching 400 to 500 feet (122 to 152 m), such as the 435 feet (133 m) "Ferguson Tree," a Eucalyptus regnans of the Watt's river, Australia in 1872, or the 415 feet (126 m) Lynn Valley Tree, a Douglas fir felled in 1902. They are often dismissed as unreliable; however, some are considered plausible and even well documented. One such example is the historic "Mineral Tree," a 393 feet (120 m) Douglas fir.

The placard recorded that the Nooksack tree produced 96,345 board feet (227.348 cubic meters) of the "finest quality" lumber. The New York Times regarded the tree in a March 7, 1897 issue as the "most magnificent fir tree ever beheld by human eyes" and called its destruction a "truly pitiable tale" and a "crime". The Morning Times of February 28, 1897 claimed that the wood, sawed into one-inch strips, would reach from "Whatcom [the tree's location] to China".

Considerable skepticism remains among tree researchers because 465 feet (142 m) is close to the theoretical height limit for the species, and even a recorded 415-foot (126 m) tree from 1902 has debated measurements. However, some big-tree experts find the over 400-foot (120 m) height claim for the Nooksack Giant believable because of its incredible lumber yield of more than 96,000 board feet (226.534 cubic meters) which was far higher than the 60,000 board feet (141.584 cubic meters) typically produced by 350-foot (110 m) Douglas firs.

During a timber cruise along the Nooksack river in 1891, 15 miles (24 km) west of Loop's Ranch, two Sumas lumbermen and surveyors, John M. Saar, and S. H. Soule, reported standing Douglas-fir trees measuring from 9-foot (2.7 m) to 14-foot (4.3 m) in diameter, estimated at 350 to 400 feet (110 to 120 m) in height. They noted one grove in particular located within 656 feet (200 m) of the railroad tracks, along the Nooksack river, south of present Everson, "in all reasonable probability, the finest group of fir trees west of the Cascade Mountains. The diameter of any individual member does not exceed nine feet, but the extreme height, estimated by good judges to be from 350 to 400 feet (110 to 120 m), the symmetry and perfection in every way is the admiration of those who have viewed them"..."On one acre it was estimated the fir timber would produce a half-million feet of lumber and half as much more of cedar. A single tree near the group rises perfectly straight from the ground, close barked and without a blemish, full two hundred feet or more to the first limb. Its diameter is nine feet, and its height possibly four hundred feet."

== See also ==
- List of individual trees
- List of tallest trees
