= Doerner Fir =

100m tree in Oregon, United States

Coordinates: 43.17951°N 123.8075°W

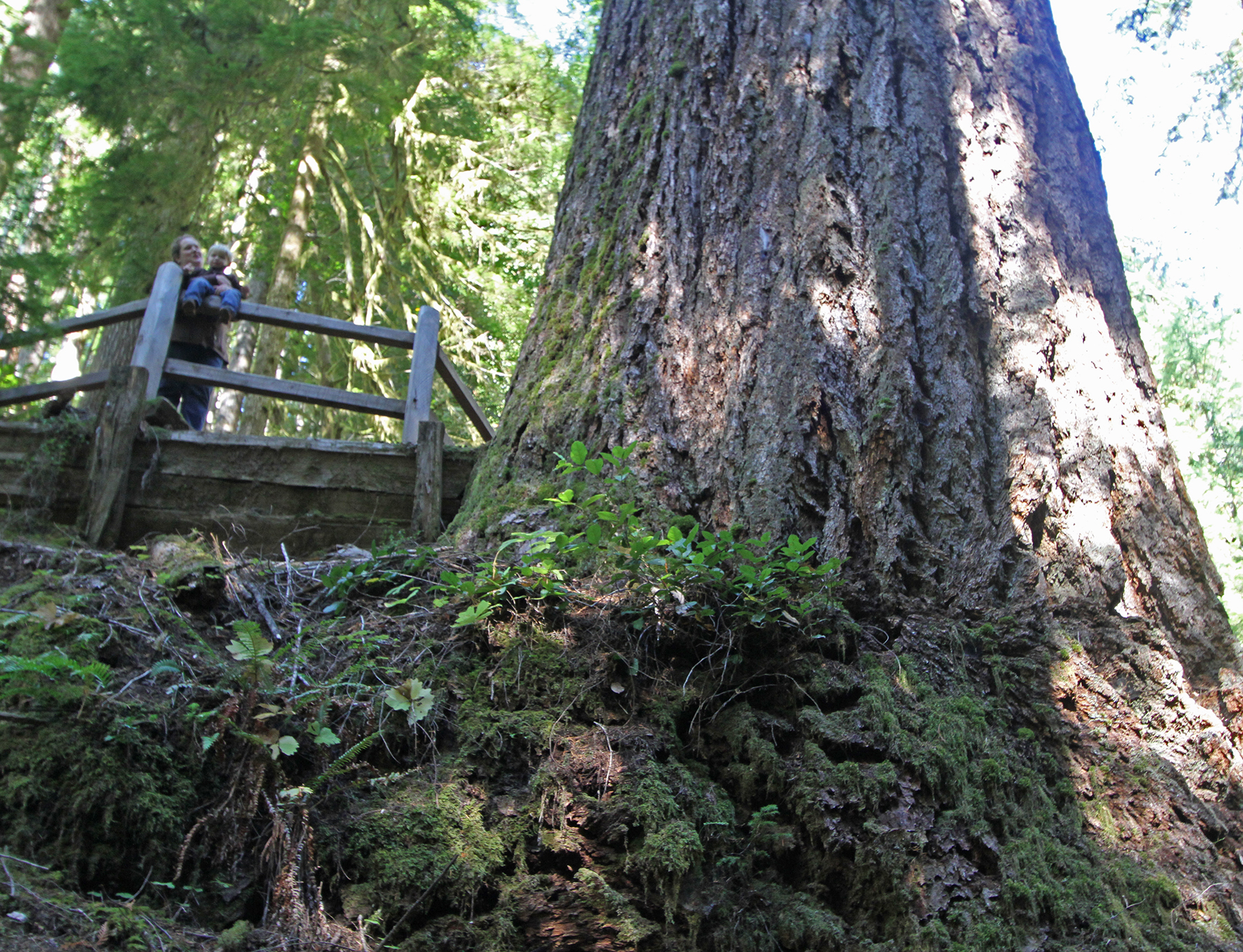
- The Doerner Fir in 2013
- Interactive map of Doerner Fir
- Species: Coast Douglas fir (Pseudotsuga menziesii var. menziesii)
- Height: 325.8 ft (99.3 m)
- Diameter: 11.5 ft (3.5 m)
- Volume of trunk: 230 m^{3} (8,120 cu ft)

The Doerner Fir, also known as the Brummitt Fir, is a former record-setting Coast Douglas-fir (Pseudotsuga menziesii var. menziesii) in Oregon, and is one of the tallest known trees in the world which is not a redwood (Sequoioideae), at 325.8 feet (99.3 m).

The Doerner Fir was previously measured in 1991 at 329 feet (100.3 m) tall but had lost 3.2 feet (1.0 m) as of the latest measurement, in 2022. Dr Robert Van Pelt notes that while 329 feet (100.3 m) tall was its height above average ground level, it is situated on a slope and a further 10 feet (3.0 m) of the trunk goes downhill, making the tree 339 feet (103.3 m) tall from extreme lowest end of stem to the very top in its prime. Numerous other Douglas fir trees estimated at over 330 feet (100.6 m) tall had been logged which had scaled 9 merchantable logs of 32 feet (9.8 m) long each, and had been cruised in Brummett creek in 1956 according to Bureau of Land Management correspondence, and US Forestry reports. Today, the tree is unique for its height. But for years, the tree was surrounded by many other giants until intensive logging reduced their numbers.

As of August 16, 2025 the trunk of the tree was burning in a fire, and had lost 50 feet (15.2 m) of its crown. According to news reports August 22, 2025, the fire has been extinguished by tall tree climbers.

The tree grows in a Bureau of Land Management (BLM) forest in Coos County. The tree was previously named the Brummitt Fir after its drainage until it was renamed in honor of Ray Doerner, a Douglas County commissioner and longtime BLM employee.

== See also ==
- List of tallest trees
- List of individual trees
- List of superlative trees
