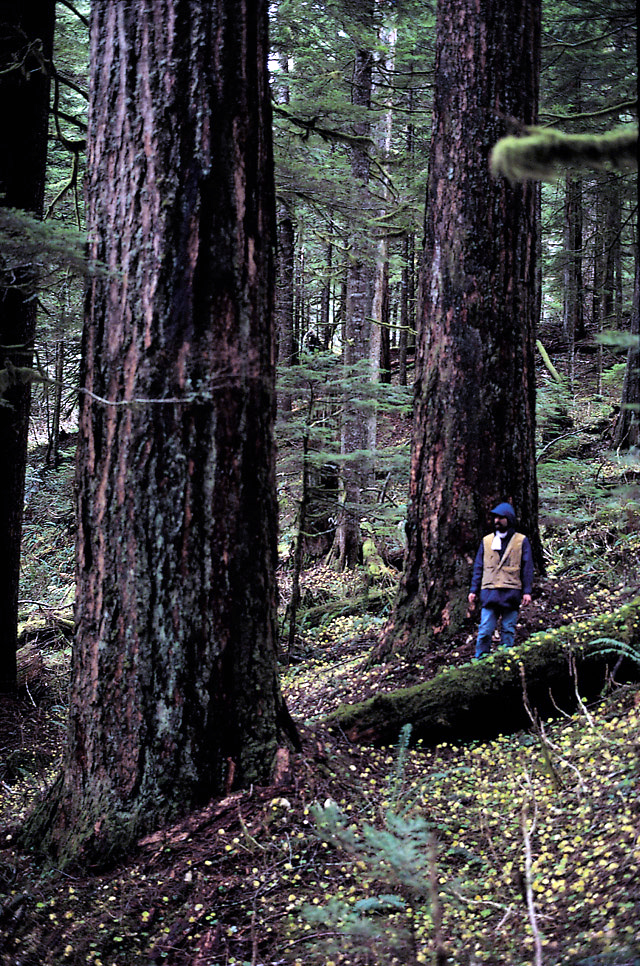
- Old-growth coast Douglas-fir (Pseudotsuga menziesii var. menziesii) forest in the Mount Hood National Forest, Oregon

Conservation status
- Secure (NatureServe)

Scientific classification
- Kingdom: Plantae
- Clade: Tracheophytes
- Clade: Gymnosperms
- Division: Pinophyta
- Class: Pinopsida
- Order: Pinales
- Family: Pinaceae
- Genus: Pseudotsuga
- Species: P. menziesii (Mirb.) Franco
- Variety: P. m. var. menziesii

Trinomial name
- Pseudotsuga menziesii var. menziesii

Synonyms
- List: Abies californica Steud. (1840); Abies douglasii (Sabine ex D.Don) Lindl. (1833); Abies douglasii var. fastigiata (Knight ex Carrière) Gordon & Glend. (1858); Abies douglasii var. pendula (Neumann) J.Nelson (1866); Abies douglasii var. stairii T.Moore & Mast. (1873); Abies douglasii var. taxifolia Lindl. (1838); Abies drummondii Gordon & Glend. (1858); Abies mucronata Raf. (1832); Abies mucronata var. palustris Raf. (1832); Abies obliqua Bong. ex Gordon (1862); Abies obliquata Raf. ex Gordon (1862); Abies standishiana K.Koch (1873); Abies taxifolia Poir. (1804); Abies taxifolia C.Presl (1851); Abies taxifolia var. pendula Neumann (1853); Abietia douglasii (Sabine ex D.Don) A.H.Kent (1900); Abietia douglasii var. fastigiata (Knight ex Carrière) A.H.Kent (1900); Abietia douglasii var. pendula (Neumann) A.H.Kent (1900); Picea douglasii (Sabine ex D.Don) Link (1842); Pinus douglasii Sabine ex D.Don (1832); Pinus douglasii var. brevibracteata Antoine (1841); Pinus douglasii var. pendula (Neumann) Parl. (1868); Pinus douglasii var. taxifolia (Lindl.) Antoine (1841); Pinus taxifolia Lamb. (1803); Pseudotsuga douglasii (Sabine ex D.Don) Carrière (1867); Pseudotsuga douglasii lombartsii-pendula Lombarts (1936); Pseudotsuga douglasii var. nana Zederb. (1907); Pseudotsuga douglasii var. pendula (Neumann) Engelm. (1880); Pseudotsuga douglasii var. pyramidalis Zederb. (1907); Pseudotsuga douglasii var. viminalis Schwer. (1919); Pseudotsuga douglasii var. viridis Schwer. (1907); Pseudotsuga menziesii subsp. viridis (Schwer.) Silba (2011); Pseudotsuga menziesii var. viridis (Schwer.) Franco (1950); Pseudotsuga mucronata (Raf.) Sudw. ex Holz. (1895); Pseudotsuga mucronata var. elongata (Lemmon) Lemmon (1897); Pseudotsuga mucronata var. palustris (Raf.) Lemmon (1897); Pseudotsuga taxifolia (Lindl.) Britton (1889); Pseudotsuga taxifolia var. brevibracteata (Antoine) Schwer. (1922); Pseudotsuga taxifolia var. elongata Lemmon (1893); Pseudotsuga taxifolia subsp. mucronata (Raf.) Schwer. (1922); Pseudotsuga taxifolia var. palustris (Raf.) Lemmon (1897); Pseudotsuga taxifolia var. pendula (Neumann) Sudw. (1897); Pseudotsuga taxifolia var. viminalis (Schwer.) Schwer. (1922); Pseudotsuga taxifolia var. viridis (Schwer.) C.K.Schneid. (1914); Pseudotsuga taxifolia subsp. viridis (Schwer.) Asch. & Graebn. (1913); Pseudotsuga vancouverensis Flous (1934); Tsuga douglasii (Sabine ex D.Don) Carrière (1855); Tsuga douglasii var. fastigiata Knight ex Carrière (1855); Tsuga douglasii var. pendula (Neumann) Beissn. (1884)

= Pseudotsuga menziesii var. menziesii =

Coast Douglas-fir

Variety of conifer

Pseudotsuga menziesii var. menziesii, commonly known as coast Douglas-fir, Pacific Douglas-fir, Oregon pine, or Douglas spruce, is a very tall evergreen conifer, being a variety of P. menziesii (Douglas-fir).

It is native to western North America and is used as timber.

== Description ==
Coast Douglas-fir is the fourth tallest conifer and fifth tallest of all currently living trees in the world (after Sitka spruce). Currently, coast Douglas-fir trees 60–75 metres (197–246 ft) or more in height and 1.5–2 m (4 ft 11 in – 6 ft 7 in) in diameter are common in old growth stands, while maximum heights of 100–120 m (330–390 ft) and diameters up to 4.5–5.5 m (15–18 ft) have been documented. The tallest known living specimen is 99.82 m (327 ft 6 in) tall, near Eugene, Oregon, and an over 100.59 m (330 ft 0 in) tall specimen at Hand Creek, Siuslaw National Forest, Oregon, only recently lost its top. The stoutest is the Queets Fir, 4.85 m (15 ft 11 in) diameter, in the Queets River valley, Olympic National Park, Washington. The tallest specimen ever was probably the Nooksack Giant, with a height of 142 m (466 ft) as measured by tape after the tree was cut down. Coast Douglas-fir commonly lives more than 500 years and occasionally more than 1,000 years.

The bark on young trees is thin, smooth, gray, and contains numerous resin blisters. On mature trees, it is thick and corky. The shoots are brown to olive-green, turning gray-brown with age, smooth, though not as smooth as fir shoots, and finely pubescent with short dark hairs. The buds are a very distinctive narrow conic shape, 4–8 mm (3/16–5/16 in) long, with red-brown bud scales. The leaves are spirally arranged but slightly twisted at the base to lie in flattish either side of the shoot, needle-like, 2–3.5 cm (3/4–1 3/8 in) long, green above with no stomata, and with two whitish stomatal bands below. Unlike the Rocky Mountain Douglas-fir, coast Douglas-fir foliage has a noticeable sweet fruity-resinous scent, particularly if crushed.

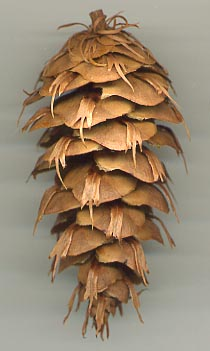
The cone, from a tree grown from seed collected by David Douglas. Note the thin 3-fingered bracts.

The mature female seed cones are pendent, 5–8 cm (2–3 1/4 in) long, 2–3 cm (3/4–1 1/4 in) broad when closed, opening to 4 cm (1 1/2 in) broad. They are produced in spring, green at first, maturing orange-brown in the autumn 6–7 months later. The seeds are 5–6 mm (3/16–1/4 in) long and 3–4 mm (1/8–3/16 in) broad, with a 12–15 mm (1/2–9/16 in) wing. The male (pollen) cones are 2–3 cm (3/4–1 1/4 in) long, dispersing yellow pollen in spring.

In forest conditions, old individuals typically have a narrow, cylindric crown beginning 20–40 metres (66–131 ft) above a branch-free trunk. Self-pruning is generally slow and trees retain their lower limbs for a long period. Young, open-grown trees typically have branches down to near ground level. It often takes 70–80 years for the trunk to be clear to a height of 5 m (16 ft) and 100 years to be clear to a height of 10 m (33 ft).

Appreciable seed production begins at 20–30 years in open-grown coast Douglas-fir. Seed production is irregular; over a 5–7 year period, stands usually produce one heavy crop, a few light or medium crops, and one crop failure. Even during heavy seed crop years, only about 25 percent of trees in closed stands produce an appreciable number of cones. Each cone contains around 25 to 50 seeds. Seed size varies; average number of cleaned seeds varies from 70 to 88/g (32,000–40,000 per pound). Seeds from the northern portion of coast Douglas-fir's range tend to be larger than seed from the south.

== Distribution and habitat ==
Coast Douglas-fir is native to western North America from west-central British Columbia, Canada, southward to Central California, United States. In Oregon and Washington, its range is continuous from the Cascades crest west to the Pacific coast, including the Pacific Coast Ranges. In California, it is found in the Klamath and California Coast Ranges as far south as the Santa Lucia Mountains, with a small stand as far south as the Purisima Hills, Santa Barbara County. In the Sierra Nevada, it ranges as far south as the Yosemite region. It occurs from near sea level along the coast to 1,800 m (5,900 ft) in the California Mountains. Further inland, coast Douglas-fir is replaced by Rocky Mountain or interior Douglas-fir (P. menziesii var. glauca). Interior Douglas-fir intergrades with coast Douglas-fir in the Cascades of northern Washington and southern British Columbia.

== Ecology ==
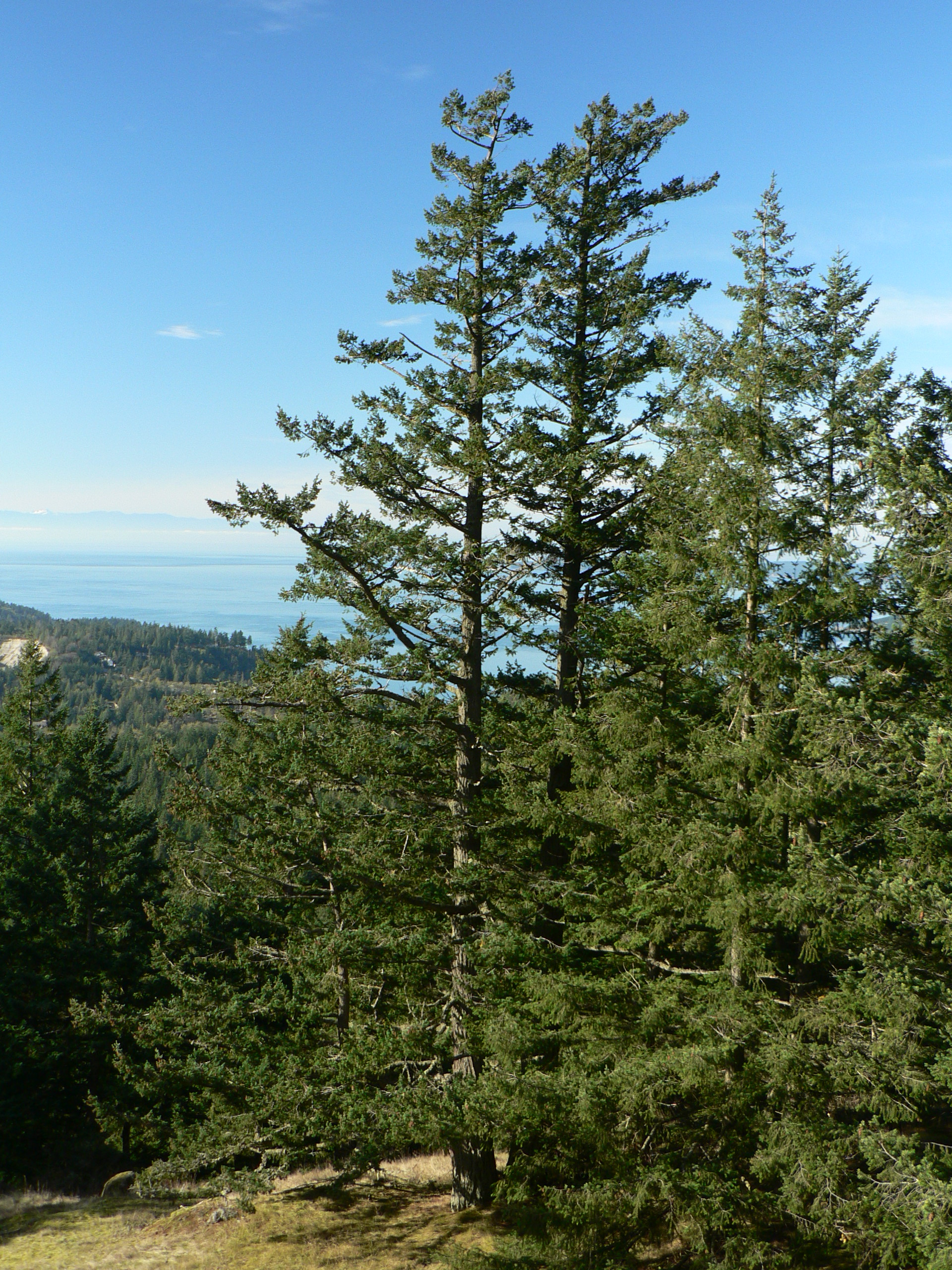
A young coast Douglas-fir stand in Anacortes Community Forest Lands, Washington

The rooting habit of coast Douglas-fir is not particularly deep, with the roots tending to be shallower than those of same-aged Ponderosa pine, sugar pine, or California incense-cedar, though deeper than Sitka spruce. Some roots are commonly found in organic soil layers or near the mineral soil surface. However, Douglas-fir exhibits considerable morphological plasticity, and on drier sites coast Douglas-fir will generate deeper taproots.

Douglas-fir snags are abundant in forests older than 100–150 years and provide cavity-nesting habitat for numerous forest birds. Mature or "old-growth" Douglas-fir forest is the primary habitat of the red tree vole (Arborimus longicaudus) and the spotted owl (Strix occidentalis). Home range requirements for breeding pairs of spotted owls are at least 400 ha (4 square kilometres (990 acres) of old-growth. Red tree voles may also be found in immature forests if Douglas-fir is a significant component. This animal nests almost exclusively in the foliage of Douglas-fir trees. Nests are located 2–50 metres (6.6–164.0 ft) above the ground. The red tree vole's diet consists chiefly of common Douglas-fir needles. A parasitic plant sometimes utilizing P. menziesii is Arceuthobium douglasii, commonly known as Douglas-fir dwarf mistletoe.

Its seedlings are not a preferred browse of black-tailed deer (Odocoileus hemionus columbianus) and elk (Cervus canadensis), but can be an important food source for these animals during the winter when other preferred forages are lacking. In many areas, coast Douglas-fir needles are a staple in the spring diet of blue grouse (Dendragapus). In the winter, New World porcupines primarily eat the inner bark of young conifers, among which they prefer Douglas-fir.

Douglas-fir seeds are an extremely important food for small mammals. Mice, voles, shrews, and chipmunks consumed an estimated 65 percent of a Douglas-fir seed crop following dispersal in western Oregon. The Douglas squirrel (Tamiasciurus douglasii) harvests and caches great quantities of Douglas-fir cones for later use. They also eat mature pollen cones, developing inner bark, terminal shoots, and tender young needles. The seeds are also important in the diets of several seed-eating birds. These include most importantly American sparrows (Emberizidae) – dark-eyed junco (Junco hyemalis), song sparrow (Melospiza melodia), golden-crowned sparrow (Zonotrichia atricapilla) and white-crowned sparrow (Z. leucophrys) – and true finches (Fringillidae) – pine siskin (Carduelis pinus), purple finch ("Carpodacus" purpureus), and the Douglas-fir red crossbill (Loxia curvirostra neogaea) which is uniquely adapted to foraging for P. menziesii seeds.

The coast Douglas-fir variety is the dominant tree west of the Cascade Mountains in the Pacific Northwest, occurring in nearly all forest types, competes well on most parent materials, aspects, and slopes. Adapted to a moist, mild climate, it grows larger and faster than Rocky Mountain Douglas-fir (Pseudotsuga menziesii var. glauca). Associated trees include western hemlock (Tsuga heterophylla), Sitka spruce (Picea sitchensis), sugar pine (Pinus lambertiana), western white pine (Pinus monticola), Ponderosa pine (Pinus ponderosa), grand fir (Abies grandis), coast redwood (Sequoia sempervirens), western redcedar (Thuja plicata), California incense-cedar (Calocedrus decurrens), Lawson's cypress (Chamaecyparis lawsoniana), tanoak (Notholithocarpus), bigleaf maple (Acer macrophyllum) and several others. Pure stands are also common, particularly north of the Umpqua River in Oregon.

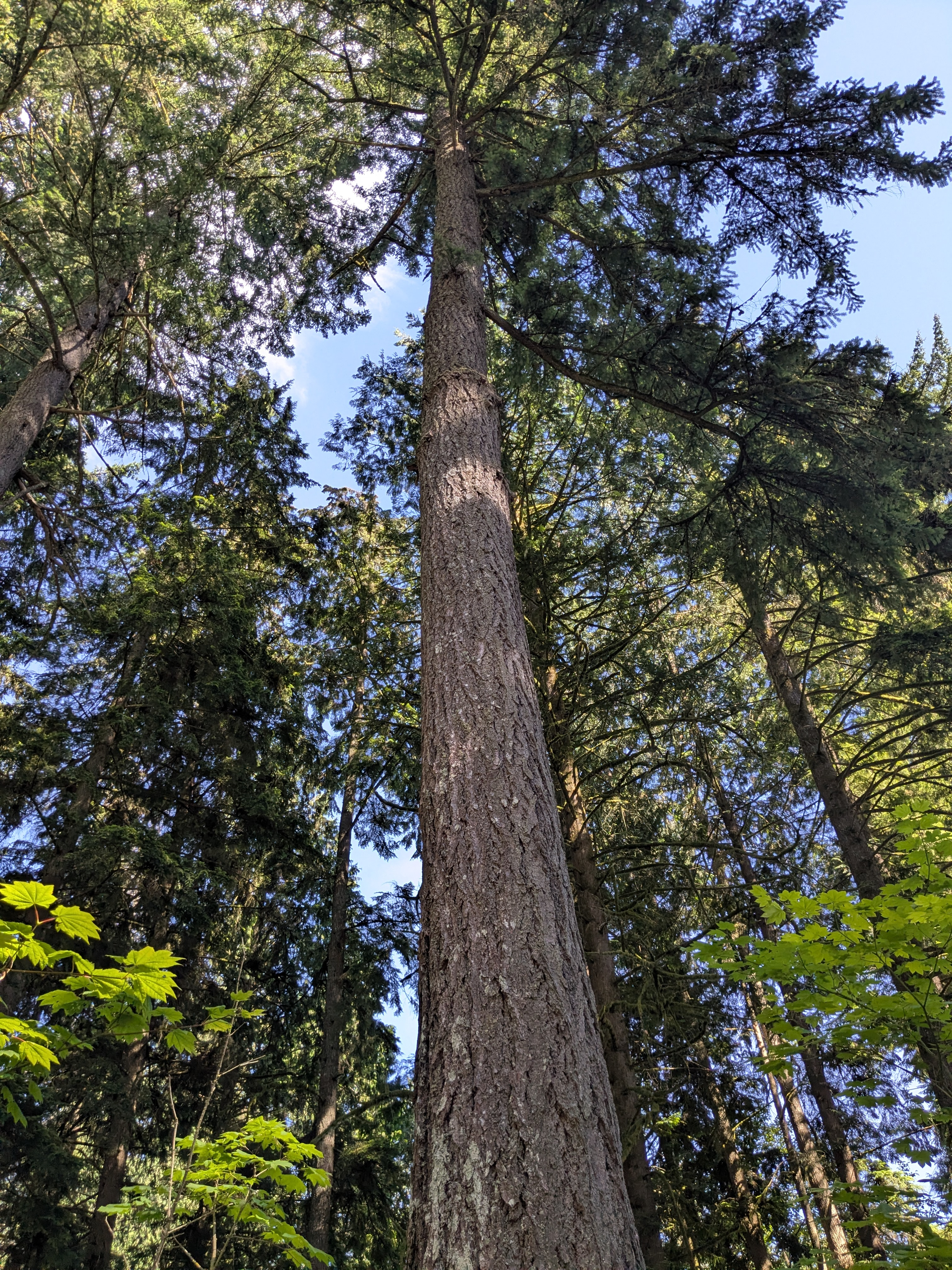
Coast Douglas-fir near Vancouver

Shrub associates in the central and northern part of Coast Douglas-fir's range include vine maple (Acer circinatum), salal (Gaultheria shallon), Pacific rhododendron (Rhododendron macrophyllum), Oregon-grape (Mahonia aquifolium), red huckleberry (Vaccinium parvifolium), and salmonberry (Rubus spectabilis). In the drier, southern portion of its range shrub associates include California hazel (Corylus cornuta var. californica), oceanspray (Holodiscus discolor), creeping snowberry (Symphoricarpos mollis), western poison-oak (Toxicodendron diversilobum), ceanothus (Ceanothus spp.), and manzanita (Arctostaphylos spp.). In wet coastal forests, nearly every surface of old-growth coast Douglas-fir is covered by epiphytic mosses and lichens.

=== Forest succession ===
The shade-intolerance of Douglas-fir plays a large role in the forest succession of lowland old-growth forest communities of the Pacific Northwest. While mature stands of lowland old-growth forest contain many western hemlock (Tsuga heterophylla) seedlings, and some western redcedar (Thuja plicata) seedlings, Douglas-fir dominated stands contain almost no Douglas-fir seedlings. This seeming contradiction occurs because Douglas-firs are intolerant of deep shade and rarely survive for long within the shaded understory. When a tree dies in a mature forest the canopy opens up and sunlight becomes available as a source of energy for new growth. The shade-tolerant western hemlock and western redcedar seedlings that establish beneath the canopy have a head-start on other seedlings. This competitive advantage allows western hemlock to rapidly fill the canopy gap, pre-empting other species that may invade, including Douglas-fir. Long-term forest dynamics plots show that the annual mortality of large Douglas-fir is only about 1%. Thus, over centuries, western hemlock and western redcedar will come to dominate the canopy.

Douglas-fir is a seral species in the wet forests of western British Columbia, Washington, Oregon, and California. In these areas, it requires a large disturbance, such as fire or a large landslide, to open the forest and expose mineral soil where its seedlings prefer to establish. It has a faster growth rate than most other trees, giving the Douglas-fir a competitive advantage when it overtops slower growing species during re-establishment of the canopy. The tree ring ages of dominant Douglas-fir trees can indicate the date of the last stand-replacing fire. Because Douglas-fir is long-lived, it can remain dominant in the forest for more than 300 years following the last fire. A history of fluctuating climate resulted in synchronous fire episodes across western Washington and Oregon, thus many Douglas-fir stands date to a warm-dry periods in the late 1400s and early 1500s, while few date to a cool-wet period from 1650 to 1800.

Douglas-fir is also particularly well adapted to fires: once they reach around 100 years in age they have thick enough bark that protects the cambium layer of the tree from heat damage. Large Douglas-fir often survive low intensity forest fires. Such sites, common in western Oregon, have two or three cohorts of Douglas-fir, adding to the complexity of the old-growth forest. Fire is increasingly rare northward towards the central coast of British Columbia where Douglas-fir is a minor component of the forest.

The logging practices of the last 200 years created artificial disturbances that allowed Douglas-fir to thrive. The Douglas-fir's useful wood and its quick growth make it the crop of choice for many timber companies, which typically replant a clear-cut area with Douglas-fir seedlings. The high-light conditions that exist within a clear-cut also naturally favor the regeneration of Douglas-fir, though in wet coastal climates alders and shrubs compete with Douglas-fir seedlings. Because of clear-cut logging, almost all of the forests west of the Cascades not strictly set aside for protection are today dominated by Douglas-fir, while the normally dominant climax species, such as western hemlock and western redcedar are less common. On drier sites in California, where Douglas-fir behaves as a climax species in the absence of fire, Douglas-fir has become somewhat invasive following fire suppression practices of the twentieth and twenty-first centuries; it is becoming a dominant species in many oak woodlands, in which it was previously a minor component.

== Cultivation and uses ==
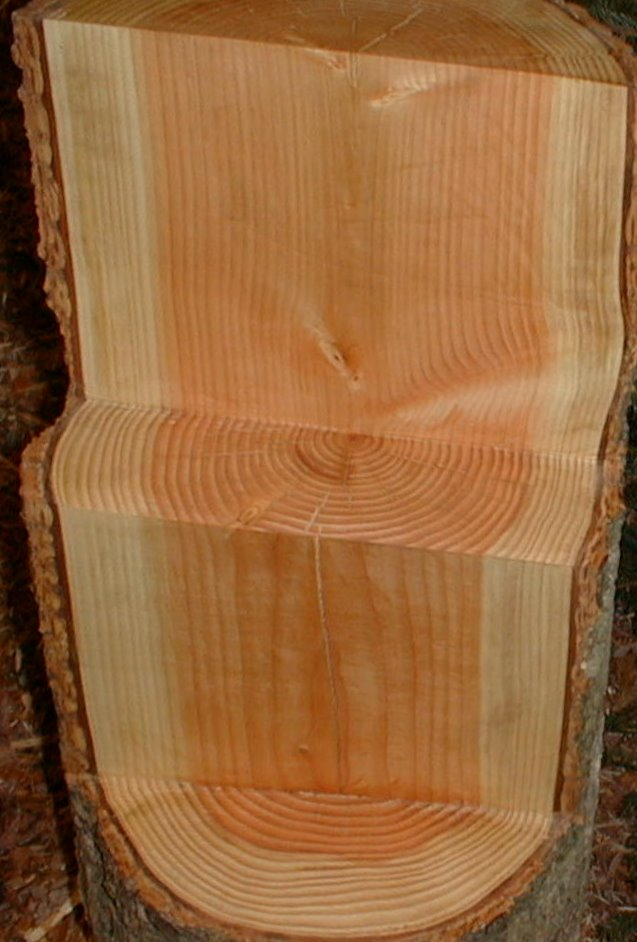
Tree rings and heartwood

Coast Douglas-fir is one of the world's best timber producers and yields more timber than any other tree in North America. The wood is used for dimensional lumber, timbers, pilings, and plywood. Creosote treated pilings and decking are used in marine structures. The wood is also made into railroad ties, mine timbers, house logs, posts and poles, flooring, pulp, and furniture. Coast Douglas-fir is used extensively in landscaping. It is planted as a specimen tree or in mass screenings. It is also a popular Christmas tree.

== Largest trees ==
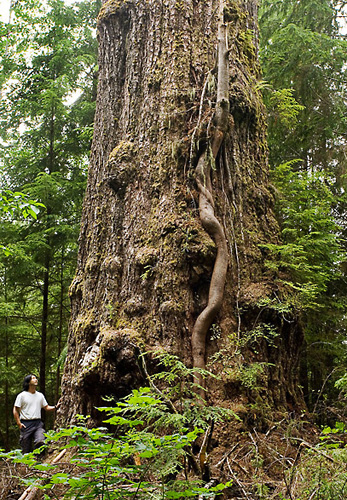
The Red Creek Fir, ca.15 km from Port Renfrew, BC, measures 43.7 ft around its base and stretches 242 ft high

As of 1995, coast Douglas-fir was the second-tallest conifer in the world (after coast redwood). Extant coast Douglas-fir trees 60–75 m (195–245 ft) or more in height and 1.5–2 m (4.9–6.6 ft) in diameter are common in old growth stands, and maximum heights of 100–120 m (330–395 ft) and diameters up to 4.5–5.5 m (15–18 ft) have been documented. The tallest living specimen is the "Doerner Fir", previously known as the Brummit Fir, 99.8 m (327.3 ft) tall, at East Fork Brummit Creek in Coos County, Oregon, the stoutest is the "Queets Fir", 4.85 m (15 ft 11 in) in diameter, in the Queets River valley of Olympic National Park in Washington. The largest at 349 cubic metres (12,300 cu ft) is the Red Creek Fir in British Columbia, Canada. Douglas-firs commonly live more than 500 years and occasionally more than 1,000 years. The tallest well-documented conifer was 393 ft (120 m), the Mineral Tree (Mineral, Washington), a coast Douglas-fir, measured in 1924 by Dr. Richard E. McArdle, former chief of the U.S. Forest Service. The volume of that tree was 515 cubic metres (18,190 cu ft). Research suggests Douglas-fir could grow to a maximum height of between 430 to 476 feet (131 to 145 m), at which point water supply would fail.

Unconfirmed reports of even taller individuals may be found in historic records.

- A tree cut down on the Alfred Nye property in 1902 in Lynn Valley on the north shore of the city of Vancouver, British Columbia, was reported to have measured 126 m (415 ft) in height, and 4.34 m (14 ft 3 in) in diameter, and another tree felled in the same valley was said to have measured 107 m (352 ft) tall.
- The Nooksack Giant, a Douglas-fir felled in 1897 at Loop's Ranch in Whatcom County, Washington, reportedly measured 142 m (465 ft) in height, 10 m (34 ft) in circumference at the butt, and 67 metres (220 ft) to the first branch. With a volume of 96,345 marketable board feet (227.35 m^{3}), this tree was estimated to be 480 years old.

The tallest tree in the United Kingdom is a coast Douglas-fir. The tree, growing near Ardentinny in Scotland stands at 68.4 m (224 ft).

== See also ==
- The world's tallest tree species
