= List of superlative trees in the United Kingdom =

Below is a list of superlative trees in the United Kingdom, containing the widest trees, the widest trees in history, the oldest trees and the tallest trees.

== Widest ==
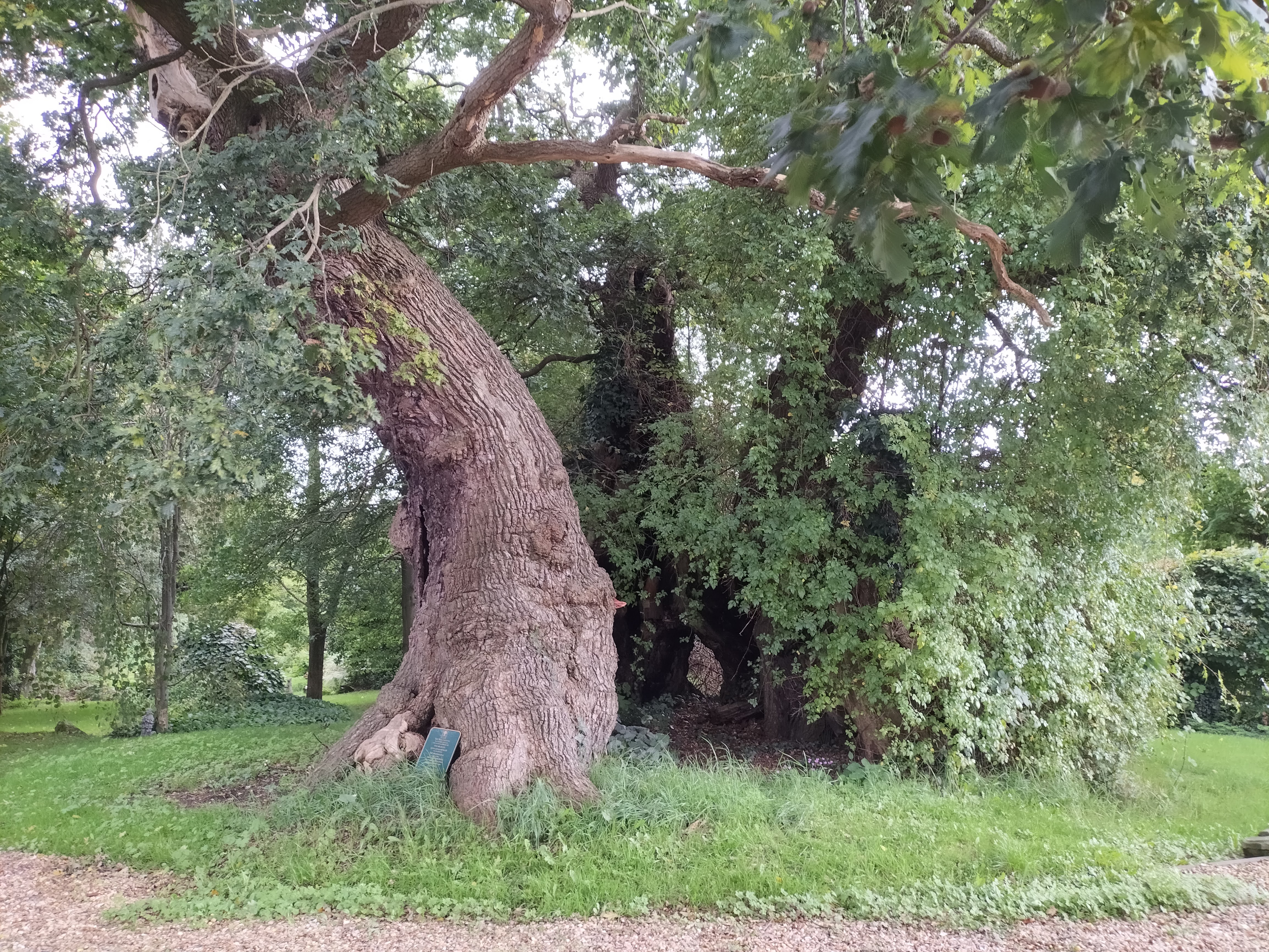
Marton Oak, currently the widest tree in the UK. 14.02-14.4m circumference

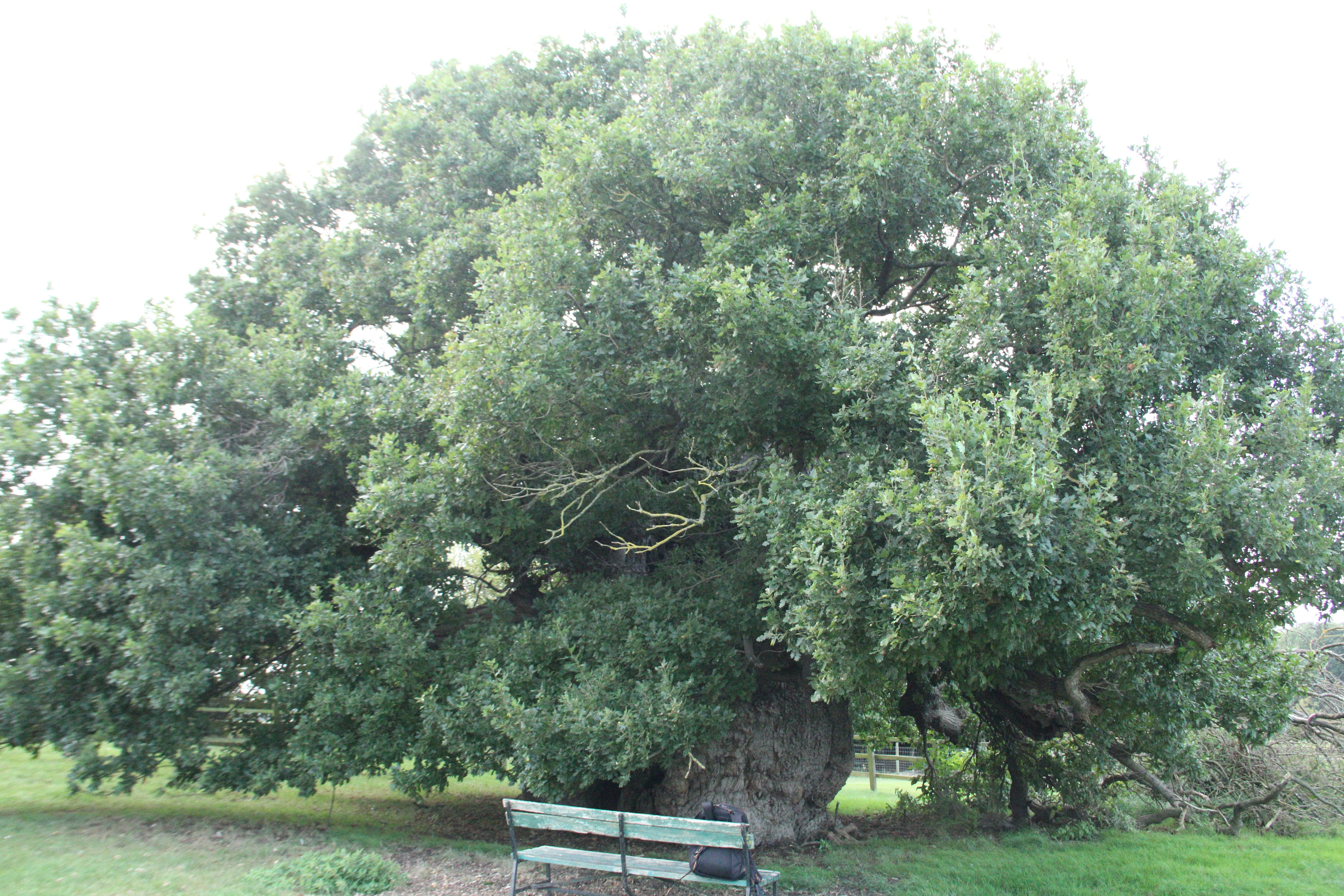
Bowthorpe Oak, 13.33m in circumference

Presently, a regularly-updated database of the UK's widest trees by girth is kept by the user-run website Monumental Trees. Width is not indicative of tree volume, however. The largest oak tree, as well as the tallest, in the UK has long been believed to be the Majesty Oak in Kent, however its 12.2m girth is exceeded by multiple trees in the UK. Similarly, the Major Oak from Sherwood Forest, another huge oak tree in the UK, also does not make the list.

List of widest trees in the UK
Tree name	Species	Girth		Location	References and notes
Tree name	Species	Meters	Feet	Location	References and notes
Marton Oak	Sessile oak (Quercus petraea)	14.02–14.4	46.0–47.2	Marton, Cheshire	The Marton Oak is the current UK champion for girth, although is not very well known and is at the end stage of its life. The tree split into three enormous pieces centuries ago, but is still considered to be a single tree. The tree grows in a private garden in the village of Marton, Cheshire. The tree is believed to be 1200 years old.
Canford School Chestnut	Sweet chestnut (Castanea sativa)	14	46	Wimborne Minster, Dorset	The Canford School chestnut is a non-native superlative tree growing on the grounds of Canford School near Bournemouth. The tree is very difficult to measure accurately due to the presence of multiple offshoots, and has sustained significant damage in the past.
Bowthorpe Oak	English oak (English oak)	13.33	43.7	Bourne, Lincolnshire	This famous tree is often mistakenly considered the widest tree in the UK. Estimates of its age vary wildly from 600 years to 1300 years. The website Monumental Trees gives its age as 823 years with an accuracy of 200 years. The tree sustained serious damage in 2021 when a significant part of the upper trunk collapsed. Its girth has been widening at an increasing rate.
Queen Elizabeth Oak	Sessile oak (Quercus petraea)	13.18	43.2	Cowdray Park, Sussex	One of the most famous trees in the UK, it is said that Queen Elizabeth visited this tree in 1591 when hunting. This tree is almost entirely hollow and it has rapidly increased in girth in recent years. Estimates of its age vary from 600 to 1000 years

== Historically the widest ==
Many of the UK's former largest trees have fallen victim to age, weather, or arson. Some of them have fallen apart into distinctly multiple trunks. This list also considers multi-stemmed trees.

List of former widest trees in the UK
Tree name	Species	Girth		Location	References and notes
Tree name	Species	Meters	Feet	Location	References and notes
Cowthorpe Oak	Oak (Quercus)	18	59	Cowthorpe, Yorkshire	The Cowthorpe Oak is believed to have been the widest and largest tree to have ever existed in the UK. At its prime, its massive crown was said to cover an area of half an acre, and its enormous trunk measured 18m in girth at ground level, and 16m at a height of 1.8 meters above ground. During the 18th century, the tree declined in health and began to deteriorate. It finally fell in the 1950s after being struck by lightning.
Newland Oak	English oak (Quercus robur)	18	59	Newland, Gloucestershire	A massive oak tree considered a rival to the size and girth of the Cowthorpe Oak, the Newland Oak was reported to have a girth of 18 meters in the 19th century. It then declined precipitously, and its girth rapidly declined as the tree began to decay. In 1950, the oak was surpassed by the Marton Oak as the widest single-trunk tree in the UK after its girth was measured at 13.72 meters. The tree fell after heavy snowfall in 1955 and a surviving branch was destroyed in an arson attack in 1970.
Fortingall Yew	European Yew (Taxus baccata)	17	56	Fortingall, Perthshire	The UK's oldest tree, and also was once one of the largest. Its girth was measured centuries ago as 17 meters. However, the tree due to its great age has now split, and now comprises a few distinctly separate stems which when taken together have a girth of 15 meters.

== Oldest ==
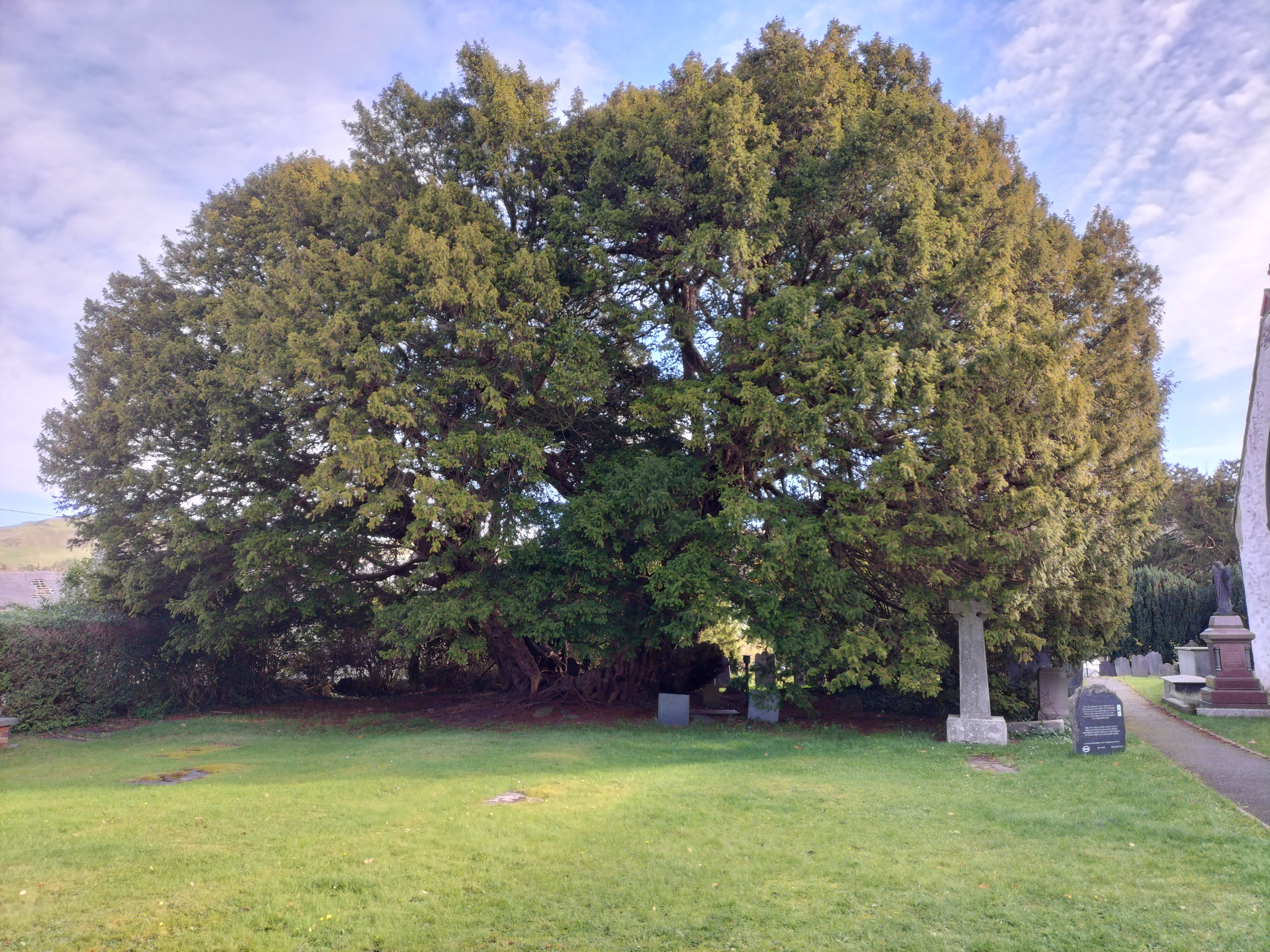
The ancient 4000+ year old yew tree at Llangernyw

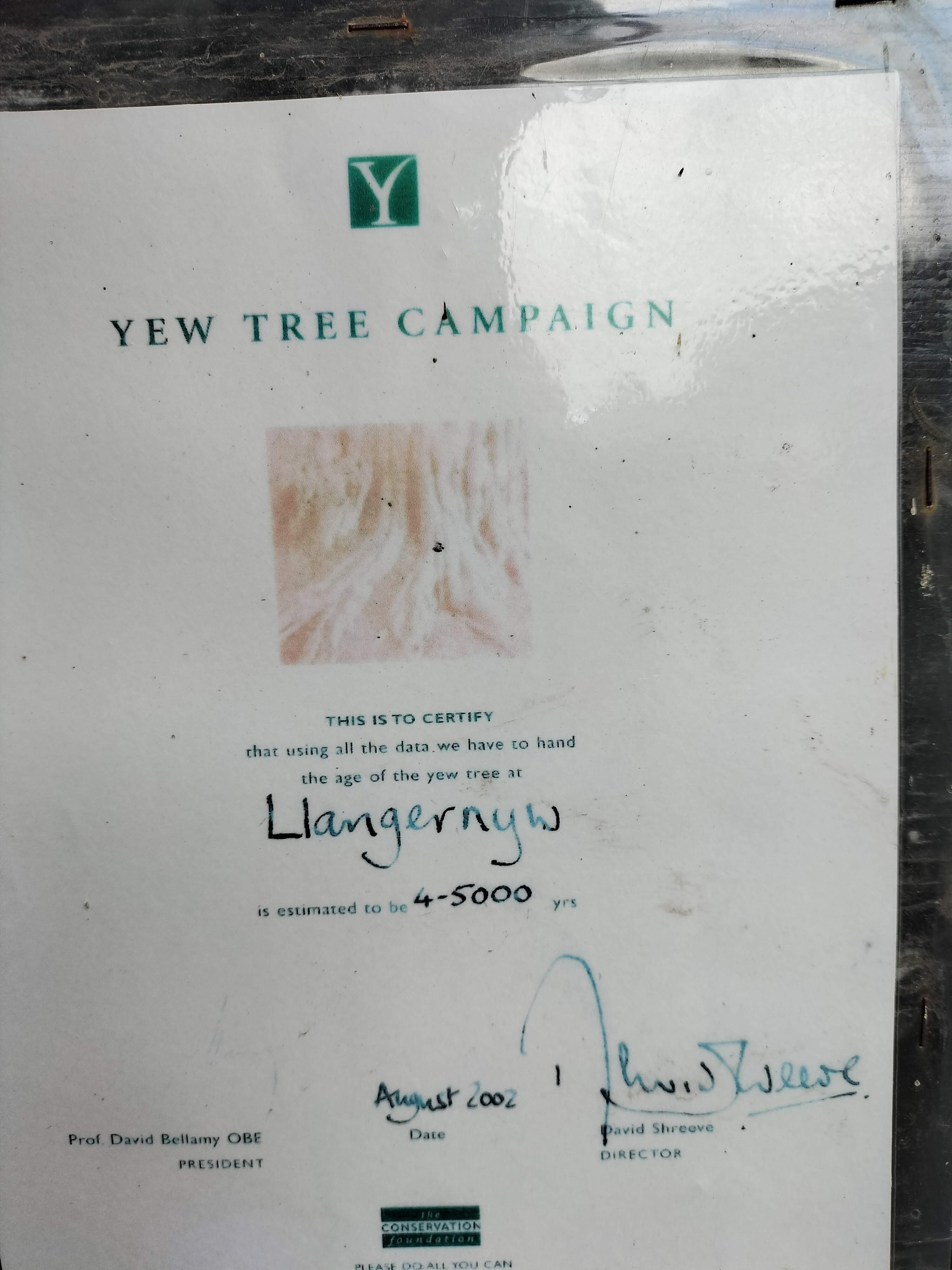
Certificate signed by Professor David Bellamy establishing the Llangernyw Yew's age

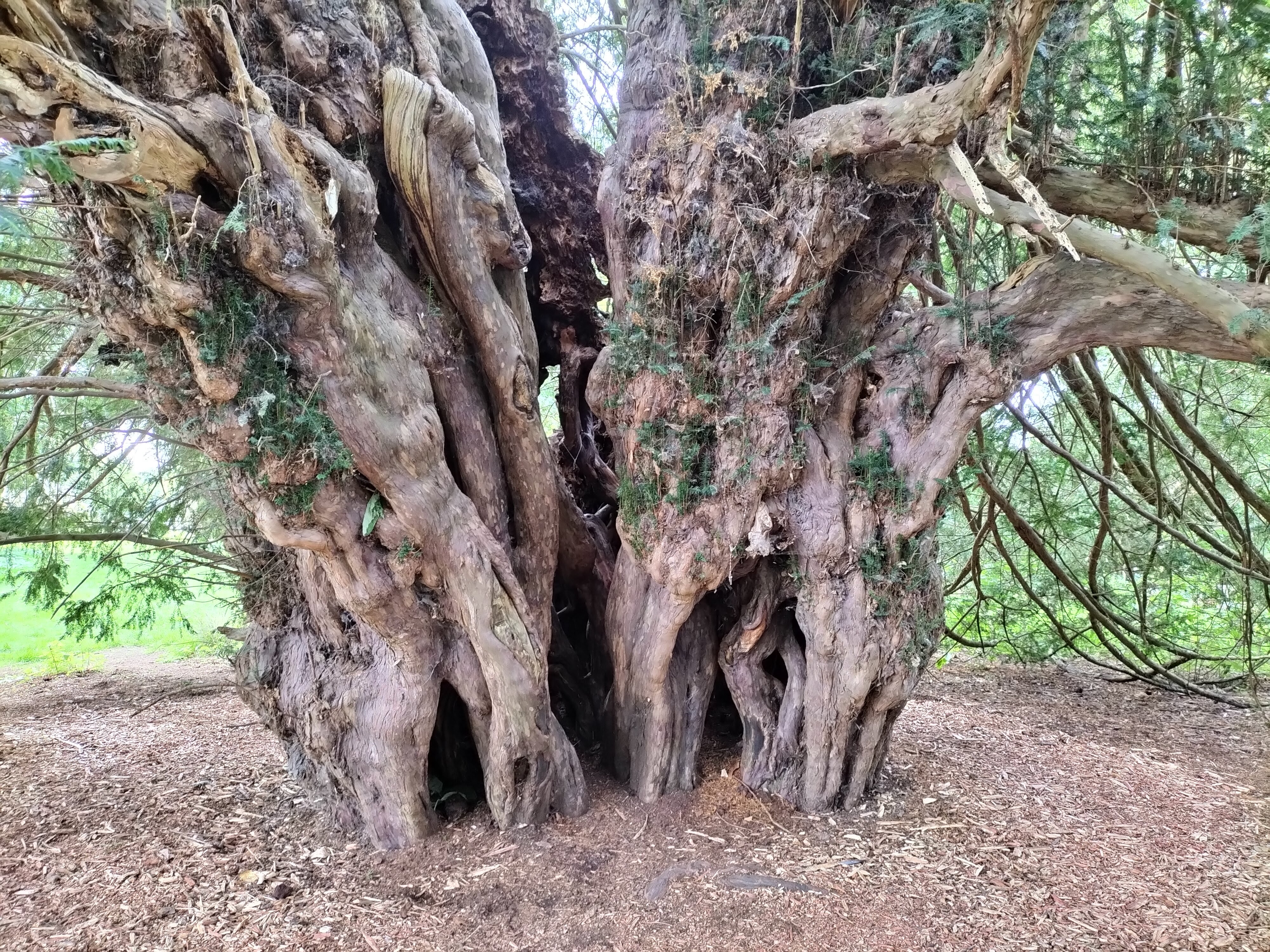
The 2500 year old Ankerwycke Yew

Several trees in the UK, all of them European yews, are thousands of years old, and one of them has been reported as 5000 years old or more, which would mean a tree older than Methuselah(tree) in California, the current official record holder for the oldest non-cloning tree in the world. The UK also has a great share of ancient oak trees, many of which are believed to be over a thousand years old. The oldest is King Offa's Oak from Windsor Great Park at 1300–1500 years old.

List of oldest trees in the UK
Tree name	Species	Age and location		References and notes
Fortingall Yew	European Yew (Taxus baccata)	5000	Fortingall, Perthshire	The Fortingall Yew has long been considered the oldest tree in the UK due to its former enormous size and the slow-growing nature of yews. Previous 19th-century estimates had the tree at 2,000-3,000 years old, although more recent estimates establish a minimum age of 5,000 years for the tree. Such an age would make it a contender for the oldest non-cloning tree in the world. Dating yews is notoriously difficult due to the absence of heartwood, which for the Fortingall Yew has long decayed, forcing researchers to rely on other methods.
Llangernyw Yew	European Yew (Taxus baccata)	4000-5000	Llangernyw, Wales	The Llangernyw Yew has long been considered one of the oldest trees in the world. The yew was investigated by David Bellamy and the Yew Tree Campaign, who concluded that, using "all available data", the yew is from 4,000 to 5,000 years old
Tisbury Yew	European Yew (Taxus baccata)	4000	Tisbury, Wiltshire	The Tisbury Yew is an extremely old tree in Wiltshire which was radiocarbon dated by David Bellamy, who established the tree's age as around 4,000 years. The tree has been filled with cement in the past.
Ashbrittle Yew	European Yew (Taxus baccata)	>3000	Ashbrittle, Somerset	The Ashbrittle Yew is an ancient yew growing over an ancient tumulus in the churchyard at Ashbrittle. This tree was mature when Stonehenge was in use.
Ankerwycke Yew	European Yew (Taxus baccata)	2273±300	Wraysbury, Berkshire	An ancient yew which is located next to the ruins of a 12th-century priory.It was alive during the signing of Magna Carta at Runnymede in 1215. It was said that Henry VIII met and courted Anne Boleyn under the yew.

== Tallest ==
The tallest tree in the UK is a non-native Douglas fir in Scotland with a height of 66.4 metres – significantly taller than the UK's tallest native tree- a 45-metre-tall (148 ft) European beech growing at the River Derwent in Derbyshire.

List of tallest trees in the UK
Tree name	Species	Height		Location	References and notes
Tree name	Species	Metres	Feet	Location	References and notes
Reelig Glen Fir	Douglas Fir (Pseudotsuga menziesii)	66.3	218	Reelig Glen, Highland	The UK's tallest tree was planted in the 19th century within the glen. Currently, multiple trees in that area exceed 55 metres and a few are over 60 metres in height due to prime growing conditions. The height was measured using a laser and subsequently confirmed during a climb. This tree is also additionally the tallest tree anywhere in Europe.
Dughall Mor	Douglas Fir (Pseudotsuga menziesii)	63.8	209	Reelig Glen, Highland	Commonly cited as the UK's tallest tree, it was planted along with even taller trees nearby during 1882.
Dunster Fir	Douglas Fir (Pseudotsuga menziesii)	63	207	Dunster, Somerset	England's tallest tree
Cragside House Fir	Douglas Fir (Pseudotsuga menziesii)	61.5	202	Cragside House, Northumberland	Has a girth exceeding 5 meters, which has been rapidly increasing in size. It was reported that the tree lost its original top in 2016.
Center Parcs Sequoia	Giant Sequoia (Sequoiadendron giganteum)	58	190	Longleat Forest, Wiltshire	This is the tallest Giant Sequoia in the UK, with a girth of 5.6 meters. Two other trees in the immediate vicinity, both giant sequoias, are 57 meters high. The trees were measured using a forestry laser.
