= Bowthorpe (disambiguation) =

Bowthorpe is a village near Norwich, England.

Bowthorpe may also refer to:

== Places ==
- Bowthorpe, a deserted medieval village near Toft, Lincolnshire, England
  - Bowthorpe Oak
- Bowthorpe, a hamlet near Menthorpe in North Yorkshire (until 1974 in the East Riding), England

== People with the surname ==
- Jack Bowthorpe (1905–1978), British businessman
- Simon Bowthorpe (born 1964), British dressage rider
