= A6121 road =

Road in England

A6121

Route information
- Length: 18.8 mi (30.3 km)

Major junctions
- Southwest end: Morcott
- A47; A1 A151
- Northeast end: Bourne

Location
- Country: United Kingdom
- Constituent country: England
- Primary destinations: Stamford

Road network
- Roads in the United Kingdom; Motorways; A and B road zones

The A6121 is a short cross-country road in the counties of Lincolnshire and Rutland, England. It forms the principal route between Bourne and Stamford and the A1 in Lincolnshire, continuing on through Ketton in Rutland to its junction with the A47 at Morcott. Its south-western end is at 52°35.5860′N 0°38.0820′W and its north-eastern end is at 52°45.9120′N 0°24.0660′W. The road has increased in importance with the rapid expansion of housing in this part of South Kesteven.

The road is deemed to start from its junction with the A47 to the west of the A1, therefore it is allocated to Zone 6 and numbered accordingly. It was the only A road in the Stamford area that was not a trunk road before the A16 was de-trunked in 2010 to become the A1175.

== Route ==
=== Morcott – Stamford ===
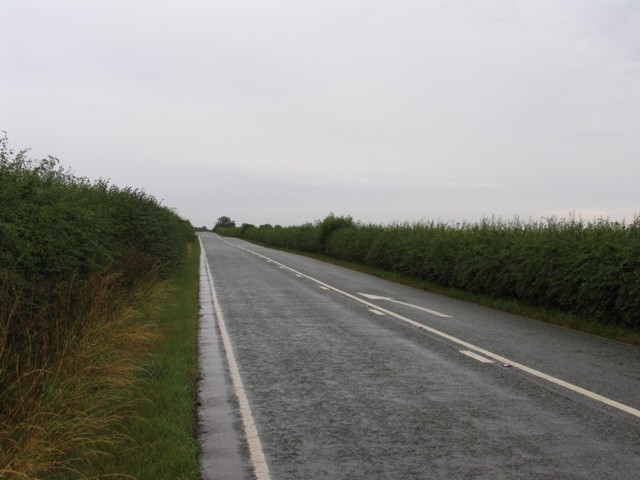
Between Morcott and South Luffenham

It begins in Morcott at the staggered crossroads with the east-west A47 and the B672 (its continuation to Caldecott), becoming Stamford Road near the White Horse Inn. It is crossed here by the Rutland Round and from here to Tinwell, west of Stamford, it follows the River Chater. From South Luffenham to Caldecott, the A6121 and B672 also follow the Rugby branch of the Syston and Peterborough Railway, which opened in 1851. The road passes through South Luffenham as Stamford Road, with a crossroads for the village and Barrowden (to the south), and the Coach House Inn. To the east of the village is the Wireless Hill roundabout for North Luffenham (to the west) and the A47 (to the south).

From here the road follows the main Syston and Peterborough Railway (part of the Birmingham to Peterborough Line), which it passes under a mile to the east, north of Luffenham Heath Golf Club, and the point where the road crosses the River Chater at Foster's Bridge. On the North Luffenham / Ketton parish boundary there is a junction for North Luffenham (to the west).

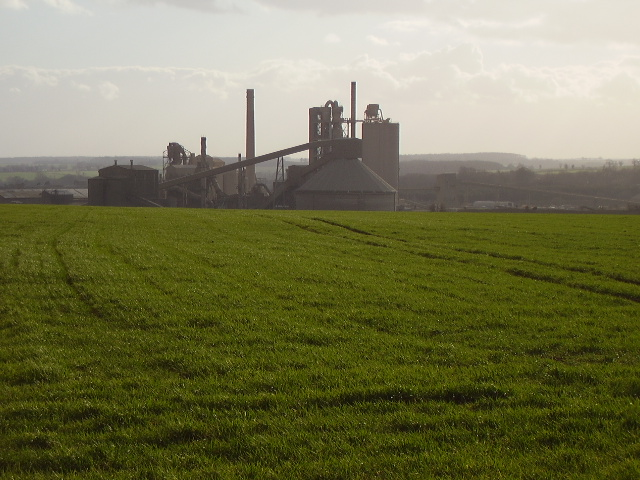
Hanson Cement at Ketton

It enters Ketton as Luffenham Road, passing a crossroads for Edith Weston (to the west), and Geeston and Aldgate (to the south). On the eastern exit of the village is the large Ketton Cement Works, to the north. A railway branch line for the factory passes under the road, and further east is a junction with Steadfold Lane, for Great Casterton, to the north. In Tinwell it passes All Saints church, to the south, and the Crown Inn. West of Tinwell, the River Chater joins the River Welland, a few hundred metres to the south. Entering Tinwell, it meets Casterton Lane to the north (for the A1/A606 junction). On the eastern side of the A1 cloverleaf junction it enters Stamford, South Kesteven, and Lincolnshire as Tinwell Road. This entry into Stamford has the best view of the Welland Valley.

=== Stamford – Bourne ===
It crosses the former Roman road Ermine Street at the junction of Roman Bank to the north and Waterfurlong to the south. It leaves the main road (Rutland Terrace), following West Street, to the left near a Waitrose. It meets Scotgate (A606 and B1081) at busy traffic lights crossroads, which is the former Great North Road. It passes to the north of Stamford town centre, along North Street and East Street, which passes the police station and Stamford School. It briefly follows the trunk road A1175, then at a mini-roundabout, follows the road to the left as Ryhall Road, with Stamford and Rutland Hospital to the right. Further north is the former site of the Mirrlees Blackstone diesel engine works, on the right hand side, now a retail park. From Stamford School, this is also part of the Macmillan Way. There is a junction with Drift Road to the left (for New College Stamford and Stamford Leisure Centre) in the part of Stamford known as Northfields.

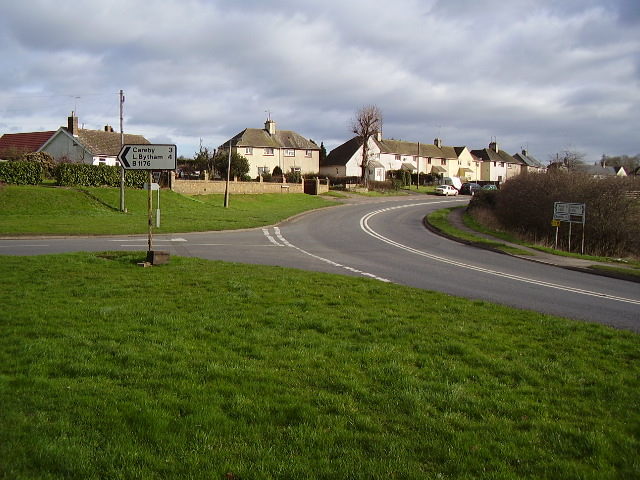
Junction with the B1176 in Ryhall

At Borderville, it re-enters Rutland. There is a staggered junction for Little Casterton (to the west), and Belmesthorpe (to the east). It passes Ryhall (to the east), and crosses the River Gwash, which the road follows from Stamford. There is a cross roads where the road bends to the right, with junctions for Great Casterton (to the west) and the B1176 to the north. It leaves Ryhall as Essendine Road, and crosses a 400 kV pylon line. It enters Essendine as Stamford Road, where it crosses the East Coast Main Line. As Bourne Road, it crosses the West Glen River. It enters Lincolnshire and South Kesteven south of the Greatford junction. Nearby to the east is the former Stamford to Bourne railway, which the road follows from Stamford. It passes on the eastern edge of Carlby, and from near Carlby Hawes wood, is the parish boundary between Witham on the Hill and Toft with Lound and Manthorpe (to the east).

There is a crossroads for Witham on the Hill (to the west), and Manthorpe (to the east). South of Toft it crosses the East Glen River. It passes the Toft Country House Hotel, and there is a left turn for Lound (to the north). There is a sharp bend to the left. Further north of Toft is a left turn for Lound. At Toft Lodge, it crosses over a tunnel of the former Melton Mowbray – Bourne railway (Midland and Great Northern Joint Railway). This is now Toft Tunnel Nature Reserve. North of here it enters Bourne, and further north is the junction with the A151, the terminus of the road, east of Auster Wood.
