= Manthorpe, Bourne =

Village in Lincolnshire, England

Coordinates: 52.731°N 0.415°W

Manthorpe
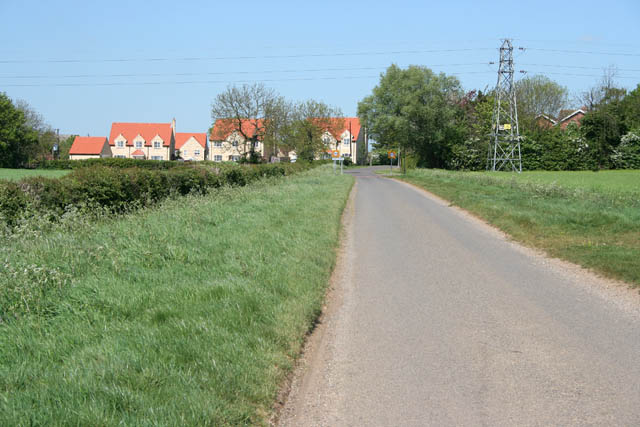

- Location within Lincolnshire
- OS grid reference: TF070160
  - London: 85 mi (137 km) S
- Civil parish: Toft with Lound and Manthorpe
- District: South Kesteven
- Shire county: Lincolnshire
- Region: East Midlands
- Country: England
- Sovereign state: United Kingdom
- Post town: Bourne
- Postcode district: PE10
- Police: Lincolnshire
- Fire: Lincolnshire
- Ambulance: East Midlands
- UK Parliament: Sleaford and North Hykeham

Manthorpe is a village in the civil parish of Toft with Lound and Manthorpe, in the South Kesteven district of Lincolnshire, England. It lies 0.5 miles (0.8 km) east from the A6121, 3 miles (5 km) south-west from Bourne and 6 miles (10 km) north-east from Stamford. Manthorpe was formerly in the parish of Witham on-the-Hill, in 1866 Manthorpe became a separate civil parish, on 1 April 1931 the parish was abolished to form "Toft with Lound and Manthorpe". In 1921 the parish had a population of 74.

At the western side of the village runs the East Glen River.

At Bowthorpe Park Farm is the Bowthorpe Oak, with the largest girth in the UK. The tree has a circumference of about 44 feet (13 metres).
