= Newland, Gloucestershire =

Village in Gloucestershire, England

Coordinates: 51.7813°N 2.6459°W

Newland
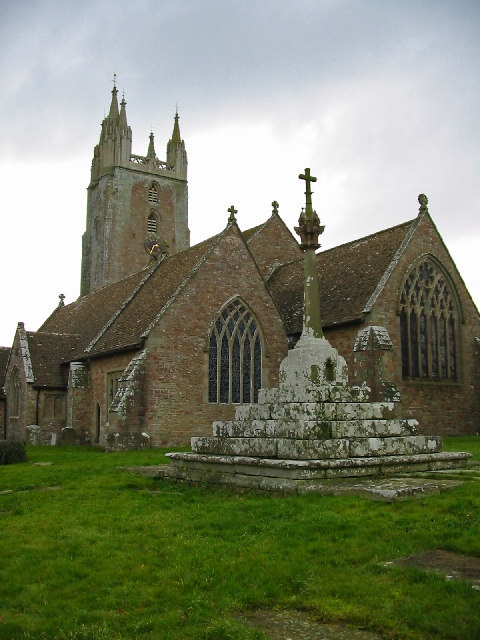
- All Saints Church, Newland

- Location within Gloucestershire
- Population: 1,033 (2011)
- OS grid reference: SO554093
- District: Forest of Dean
- Shire county: Gloucestershire
- Region: South West
- Country: England
- Sovereign state: United Kingdom
- Post town: Coleford
- Postcode district: GL16
- Dialling code: 01594
- Police: Gloucestershire
- Fire: Gloucestershire
- Ambulance: South Western
- UK Parliament: Forest of Dean

Newland is a village and civil parish in the Forest of Dean in Gloucestershire, England. situated on the east side of the River Wye, 3 miles (5 km) south-east of Monmouth. It is notable for its parish church of All Saints, known as the 'Cathedral of the Forest'. It was the centre of a large parish with complex boundaries and scattered settlements.

== The church ==
The church, dedicated to All Saints, was founded shortly before 1216. It was sited on a low, flat-topped hill, sheltered by higher hills except to the south where the land descends to the River Wye. The church comprises a chancel with side chapels, an aisled nave with south chapel and south porch, and a west tower. The tower was begun in the late 13th century, although the upper stages are of the late 14th or early 15th century. The chancel, the chapel south of it, the arcades and aisles, and the south porch are mainly 14th century features, and the north and east chapels were added in the 15th century. The church was thoroughly restored between 1861 and 1863 by William White, who reconstructed much of the chancel, the arcades, and the north aisle wall. Buttresses were added, new roofs were put on, and the clerestory was heightened.

The church contains several effigies including that of Sir John and Lady Joyce of Clearwell who died in 1344 and 1362 respectively, and an effigy of Jenkin Wyrall, Forester of Fee (died 1457), which shows details of the hunting costume of that period. It also contains the "Miners Brass", just 1 ft (30 cm) high, which depicts a helmet, crest and figure of a mediaeval miner of the Forest of Dean with a hod and pick in his hand and candlestick in his mouth. The church is often referred to as the 'Cathedral of the Forest'.

== The village ==
The church had attracted buildings around it by the mid 14th century. One of the earliest chantry grammar schools was founded here by Joan Greyndour in the 1440s. A house for the school's master was built near the church. The church became the most significant point of reference in the large, dispersed parish: in the late Middle Ages and until the 17th century the village was known as Churchend. The chantry school ended in 1547 but it was restarted in the name of Thomas Bell after 1577.

By the mid 14th century there were several houses on a lane running along the south side of the churchyard and that lane was probably the site of butchers' shambles in the 16th century; from 1617 most of its south side was occupied by a row of almshouses built for the charity of William Jones. The hillside south of the churchyard, formerly called Wolf hill, and the valley below had several houses in the 15th century. The lane there, leading from the Clearwell road towards Redbrook, was called Nether Churchend Street in 1472, but it appears also to have been called Warlows way at that period. Before it divides into French Lane and the valley lane at the south-west corner of the village, it is joined by a lane, known as Payns Lane in 1425 and later Savage Hill, descending steeply from the churchyard. In the early modern period the valley south of the village was the site of tanneries, such as Tan House and in 1695 the road there was known as Barkhouse Lane from that trade, but in the 20th century it was called Laundry Road then Laundry Lane. West of the hill three or four houses stood by Black brook, above its crossing by French Lane, in the early 17th century. Their later disappearance was presumably the result of the incorporation of that area in the grounds and garden prospect of Newland House, built on the hill above.

In the 15th and 16th centuries an unofficial market was held at Newland village, the traders taking advantage of the large numbers congregating at the parish church on Sundays and feast days. It probably lapsed during the 17th century when Coleford became a market town. William Jones of Monmouth endowed almshouses in this his home village of Newland. They are still run by the Worshipful Company of Haberdashers who have been the guardians of the almshouses since their establishment. With the growth of Coleford, Newland remained small and mainly residential with two sets of almshouses, a grammar school, and in the mid 18th century a successful private school.

== The parish ==
Newland parish was created in the early Middle Ages by assarting woodland and waste from the Forest of Dean, and its formation was well under way by the start of the 13th century, when the parish church was built. It was called Welinton in 1220 and was described as the 'new land of Welinton' in 1232 and 1247, but later it was called simply Newland (Nova Terra). The main block of the parish was formed by the tithings of Newland, Clearwell, and Coleford, but by the 14th century other scattered parcels of land in the Forest were being indiscriminately added to the parish as they became assarted from the Forest waste, which meant that the parish gained 22 detached parts. The largest detached portion of the parish included Bream village. Coleford tithing became a separate civil parish in 1894, and the detached parts were added to other parishes between 1883 and 1935.

== The Newland Oak ==
A short distance north of the village (grid reference SO551099) stood the Newland Oak, which it is claimed had the largest circumference of any Common Oak (Quercus robur) ever recorded. Measurements taken by the Royal Scottish Arboricultural Society in 1898 record that the tree had a girth of 46 ft 4 in (14.12 m) ) at a 1 ft (30 cm) height. By 1950 the tree had lost several large limbs, and the tree suffered a near fatal collapse during a snowstorm in May 1955. The remnants of the tree were set on fire by vandals in 1970. Cuttings were taken in December 1964, and a new tree raised from one of these cuttings now stands where the old oak stood.

== The Tram road ==
The Monmouth tramroad, opened in 1812 to link the Forest mines and Monmouth, crossed the parish east of Newland village, where its course included a short tunnel below Bircham wood. In the upper Red brook valley it ran in Staunton and Dixton Newton (Monmouth), over the boundary, but a branch, by means of an incline crossing the road and stream at Upper Redbrook hamlet, served wharfs on the Wye at Lower Redbrook. Only a modest traffic ran to Redbrook and the tramroad as a whole was little used after the mid 19th century when Monmouth was provided with a rail link to the South Wales coalfield. In 1883 the Coleford Railway to Monmouth was opened, using the old tramroad route, except for some short deviations, and serving Newland by a small station within Staunton parish near Cherry Orchard Farm. The railway was closed in 1916.
