= Windsor Great Park =

Royal park in Southern England

- Windsor Park
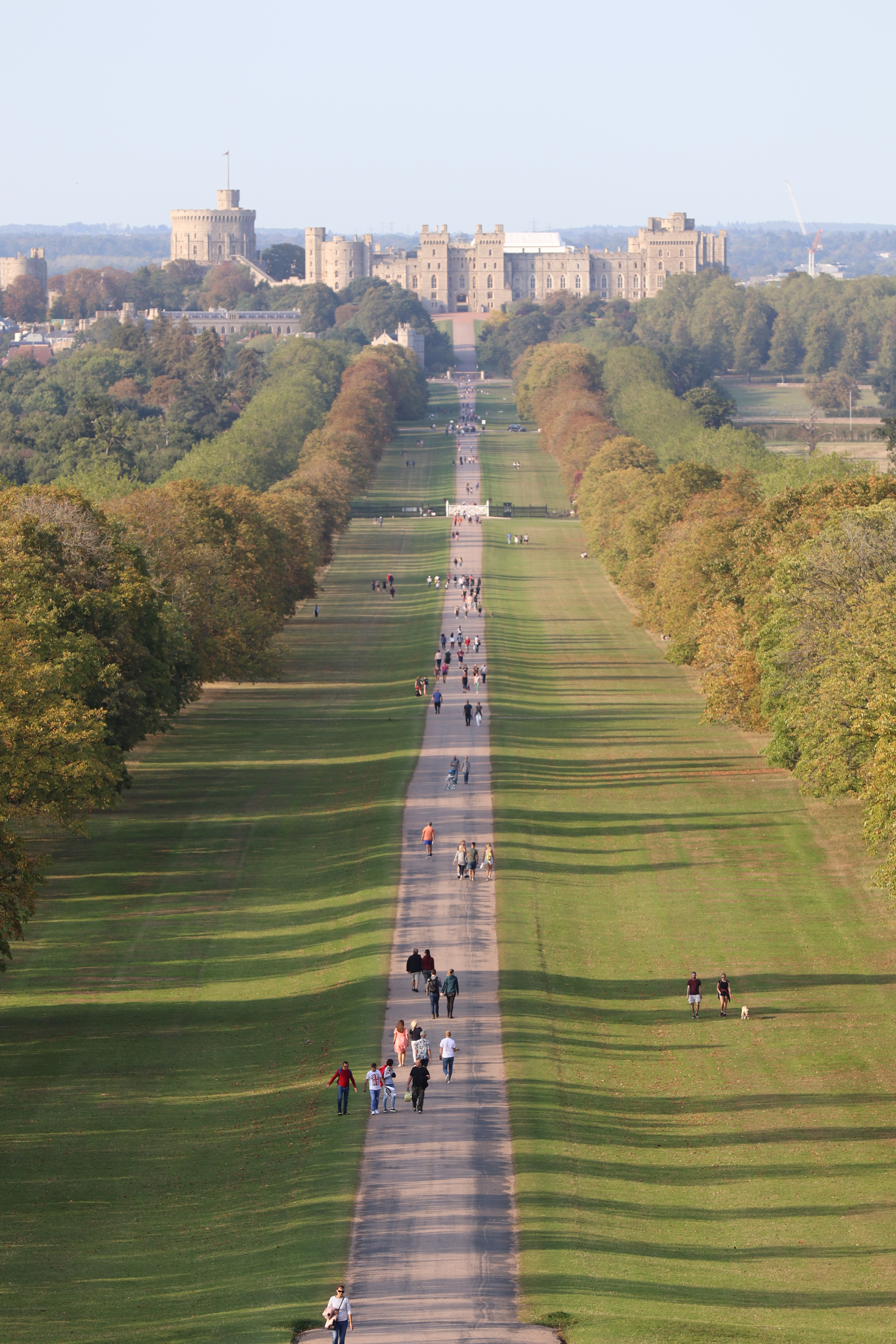
- The Long Walk to Windsor Castle
- Interactive map of Windsor Great Park
- Location: Windsor, Berkshire, England
- Nearest city: London
- Coordinates: 51°26′21″N 0°37′29″W
- Area: 2,020 hectares (5,000 acres)
- Owner: Crown Estate
- Status: Open
- Public transit: Windsor and Eton Central; Windsor and Eton Riverside; Virginia Water; Thames Valley Buses Route 1; National Cycle Route 4
- Website: Official website

National Register of Historic Parks and Gardens
- Official name: Windsor Castle and Home Park
- Designated: 31 August 1999; 27 years ago
- Reference no.: 1001434
- Part of: Royal Estate, Windsor

Windsor Great Park is a royal park of 2,020 hectares (5,000 acres) to the south of the town of Windsor on the border of Berkshire and Surrey in England. It is adjacent to the private 265-hectare (650-acre) Home Park, which is nearer the castle. The park was, for many centuries, the private hunting ground of Windsor Castle, which dates primarily from the mid-13th century and still includes a deer park. Historically the park covered an area many times the current size known as Windsor Forest, Windsor Royal Park or its current name. The park is managed and funded by the Crown Estate, and is the only royal park not managed by The Royal Parks. Most parts of the park are open to the public, free of charge, from dawn to dusk, although there is a charge to enter Savill Garden.

Except for a brief period of privatisation by Oliver Cromwell to pay for the English Civil War, the area remained the personal property of the monarch until the reign of George III when control over all Crown lands was handed over to Parliament. The park is owned and administered by the Crown Estate, a public body established by an act of Parliament, the Crown Estate Act 1961, in which the monarch and family members associated with its particular parts have non-executive, advisory roles. The park is on the Register of Historic Parks and Gardens with a Grade I listing. Windsor Forest and Great Park is a Site of Special Scientific Interest. Windsor Great Park is a nationally important site for fungi. Over 1,000 species have been found on the park's territory, including 43 species confined exclusively to Windsor. Several of Britain's rarest and most endangered species of fungi occur on the park's territory.

== Geography ==
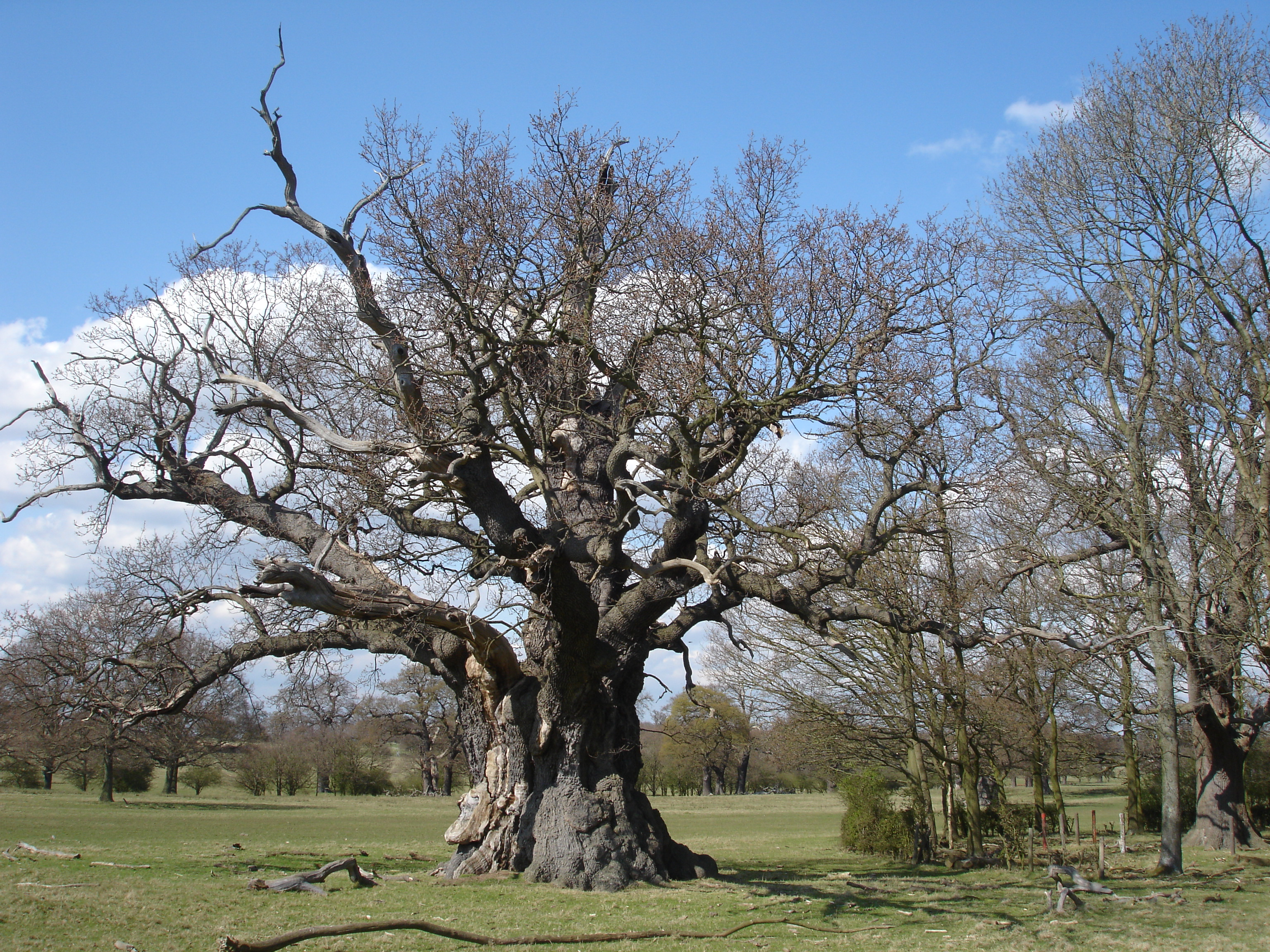
An ancient oak tree in the park

The Great Park is a gently undulating area of varied landscape. It has sweeping deer lawns, small woods, coverts and areas covered by huge solitary ancient oak trees. There is a small river in the north of the park called the Battle Bourne, running to the Thames near Datchet. The River Bourne runs through a number of ponds to the south. Chief amongst these are Great Meadow Pond and Obelisk Pond, near the great lake of Virginia Water. The most prominent hill is Snow Hill, and the avenue of trees known as the Long Walk runs between Snow Hill and Windsor Castle. The area is accessed by a number of gates: Queen Anne's Gate, Ranger's Gate, Cranbourne Gate, Forest Gate, Sandpit Gate, Prince Consort's Gate, Blacknest Gate, Bishop's Gate and Bear's Rails Gate; the original medieval park pale can still be seen in places. The main road into Windsor known as Sheet Street (A332), runs through the northeast of the park. On the western side of the park is The Village, built in the 1930s to house royal estate workers. It has a village shop and an infant/junior school. Other buildings include the Royal Lodge, Cumberland Lodge, the Cranbourne Tower and Norfolk Farm. The park lies mostly within the civil parish of Old Windsor, though the eastern regions are in the Borough of Runnymede and there are small areas in the parishes of Winkfield and Sunninghill. Areas associated with or attached to the Great Park, but not officially within its borders include the Home Park, Mote Park, Flemish Farm, Cranbourne Chase, Forest Lodge and South Forest.

Windsor Great Park has one of the largest collections of ancient oaks remaining in Western Europe. The oldest is a huge pedunculate oak known as King Offa's Oak, which grows in a private area of the estate. Tree experts estimate the tree's age as 1,300-1,500 years old, making this ancient tree the oldest oak in the United Kingdom since the collapse of the Pontfadog oak, surpassing the 1,200-year old Marton Oak in Cheshire. Other famous and ancient trees in the park include the popular Conqueror's oak in Cranbourne Park.

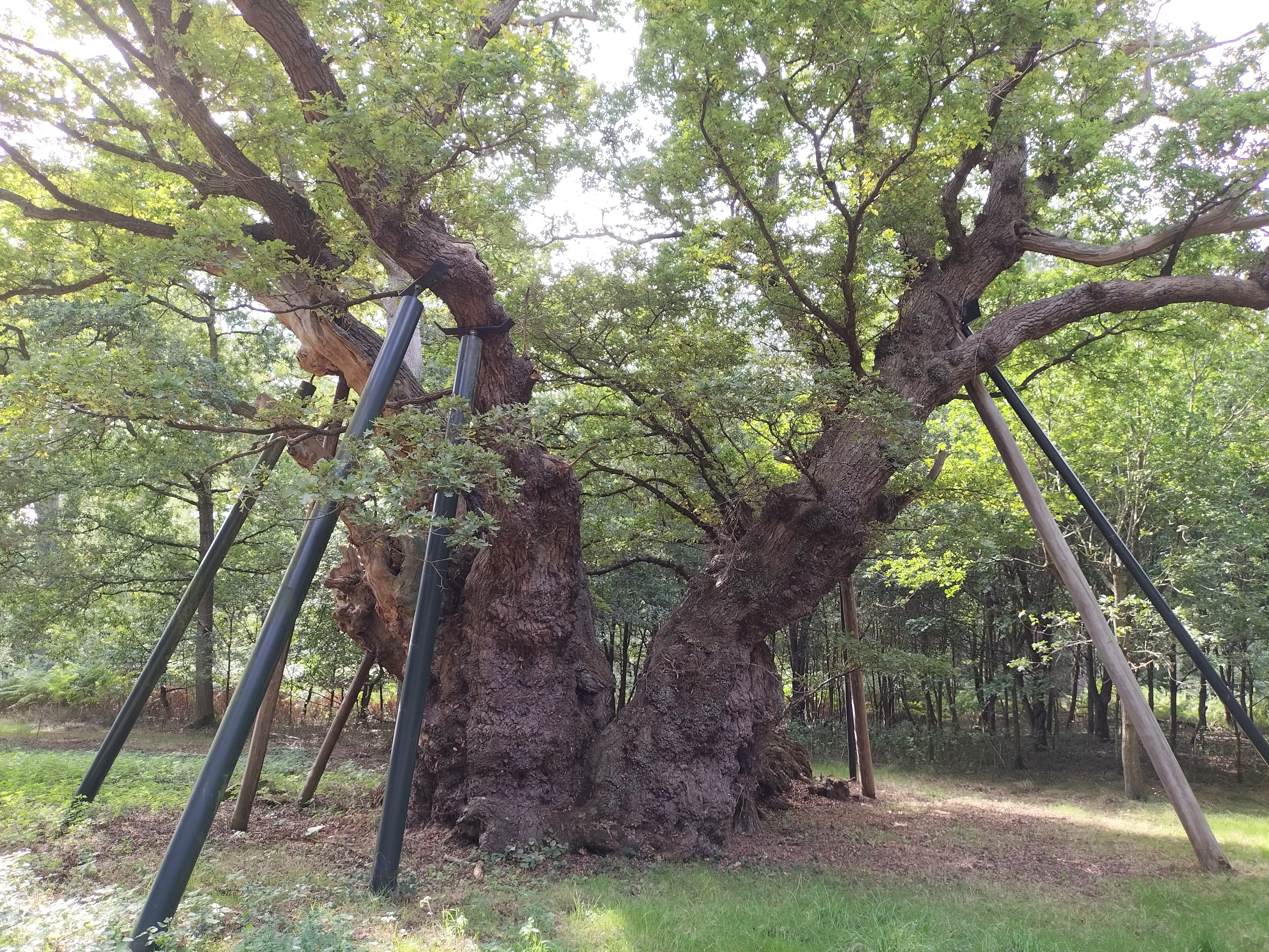
King Offa's Oak Windsor

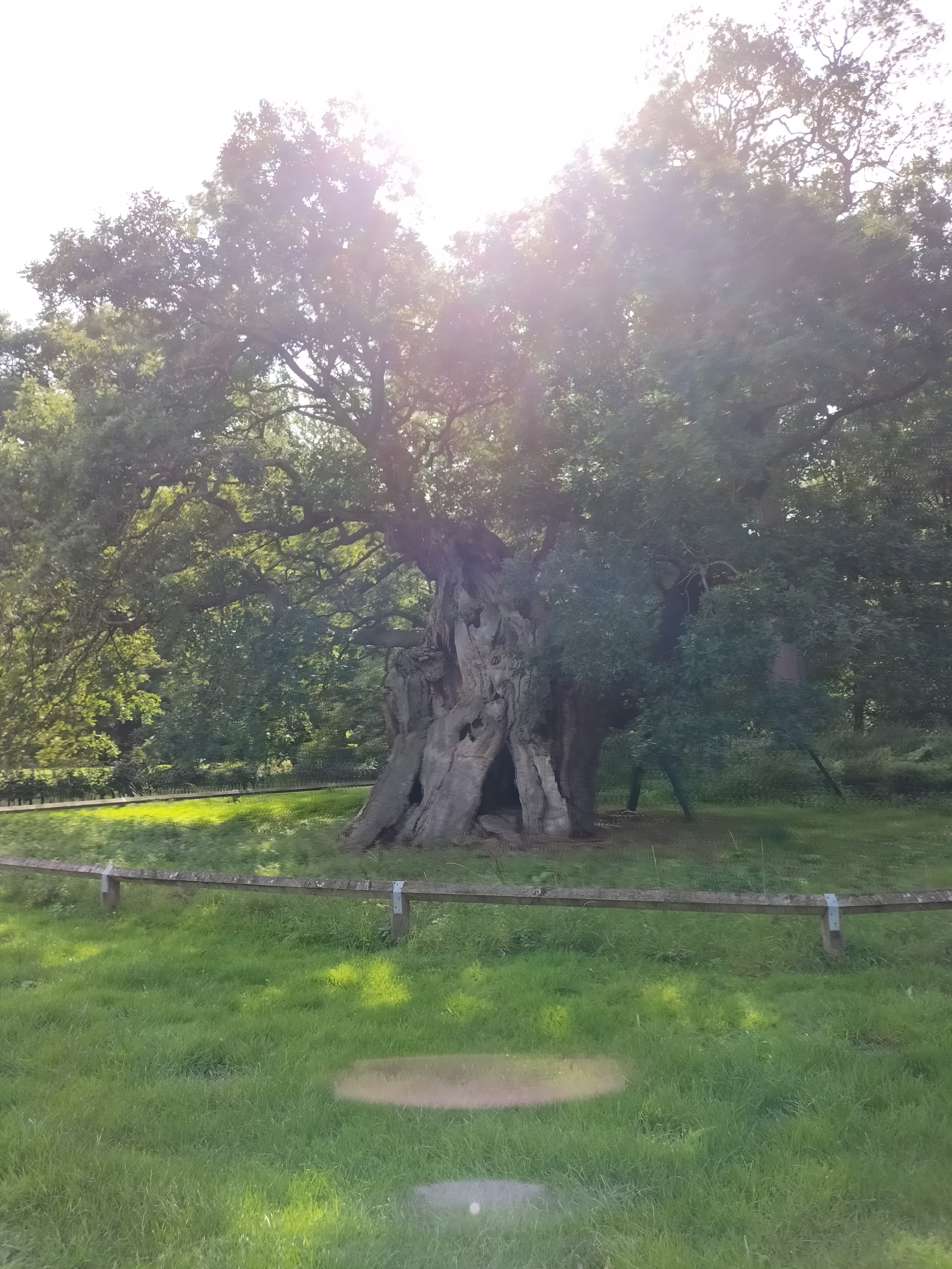
Conqueror's Oak

== History ==
=== Formation ===
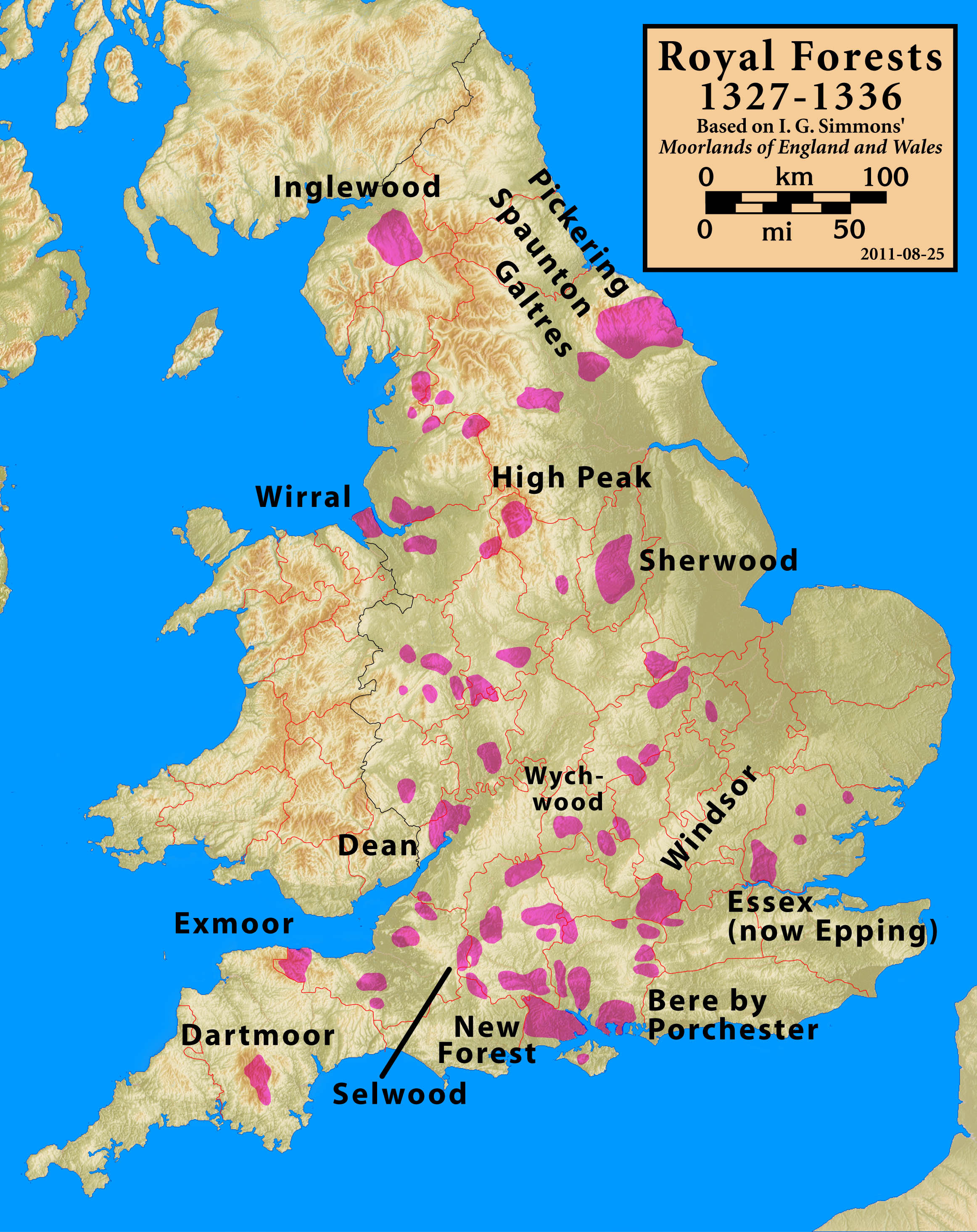
Map of the royal forests in Great Britain (1327–1336)

Windsor Castle was begun in the 11th century by William the Conqueror as it afforded a good defensive point over the River Thames. A vast area of Windsor Forest to the south of the castle became reserved by the King for personal hunting and also to supply the castle with wood, deer, boar and fish. It was not until later that it became necessary to formally define this area. In 1129, the first parker was appointed, and in 1240, King Henry III officially set out the borders of the 'park', a region many times larger than the current Great Park. Though Windsor Castle was a lavish royal residence by this time, when hunting, King Henry would likely have stayed at Windsor Manor, a moated site he had constructed at what would become Virginia Water in the heart of the forest. The title 'parker' exists today as "Ranger of the Park", the current title-holder being Charles III. Kings Edward I and Edward III used the park for jousts and tournaments and the latter had his royal stud there to supply horses for the Hundred Years' War. The moat at Bear's Rails contained the manor house of Wychamere, the home of William of Wykeham while he was building the castle. It was later used for bear-baiting.

=== Development ===
By the 18th century, the food value of the parkland to Windsor had decreased in importance and the new Hanoverian monarchs preferred to build on and garden the land rather than hunt in it. The Long Walk had been laid out by King Charles II and the planting of its trees completed by William of Orange in the 1680s, with double rows of elms which lasted until World War II, but the Georges extended it and built numerous features and monuments, such as the Copper Horse (depicting George III) and the Obelisk (in honour of William, Duke of Cumberland). George III had a set of 2,000-year-old Roman ruins imported from Libya and placed in the park.

Virginia Water was begun in 1746 by William, Duke of Cumberland who was then ranger of the park. Few details are recorded of the building of the lake; however it has been suggested that prisoners of war from the recent Jacobite risings, who were encamped at the nearby Breakheart hill, were involved. The original lake was much smaller than the current form, and was destroyed in a flood in 1768. In 1780, Paul and Thomas Sandby began construction of a much larger lake at the site, and went on to add an artificial waterfall, Meadow Pond and Obelisk Pond. The lake replaced a small stream of the same name which was probably named after Queen Elizabeth I, who was known as the "Virgin Queen".

=== Victorian expansion ===
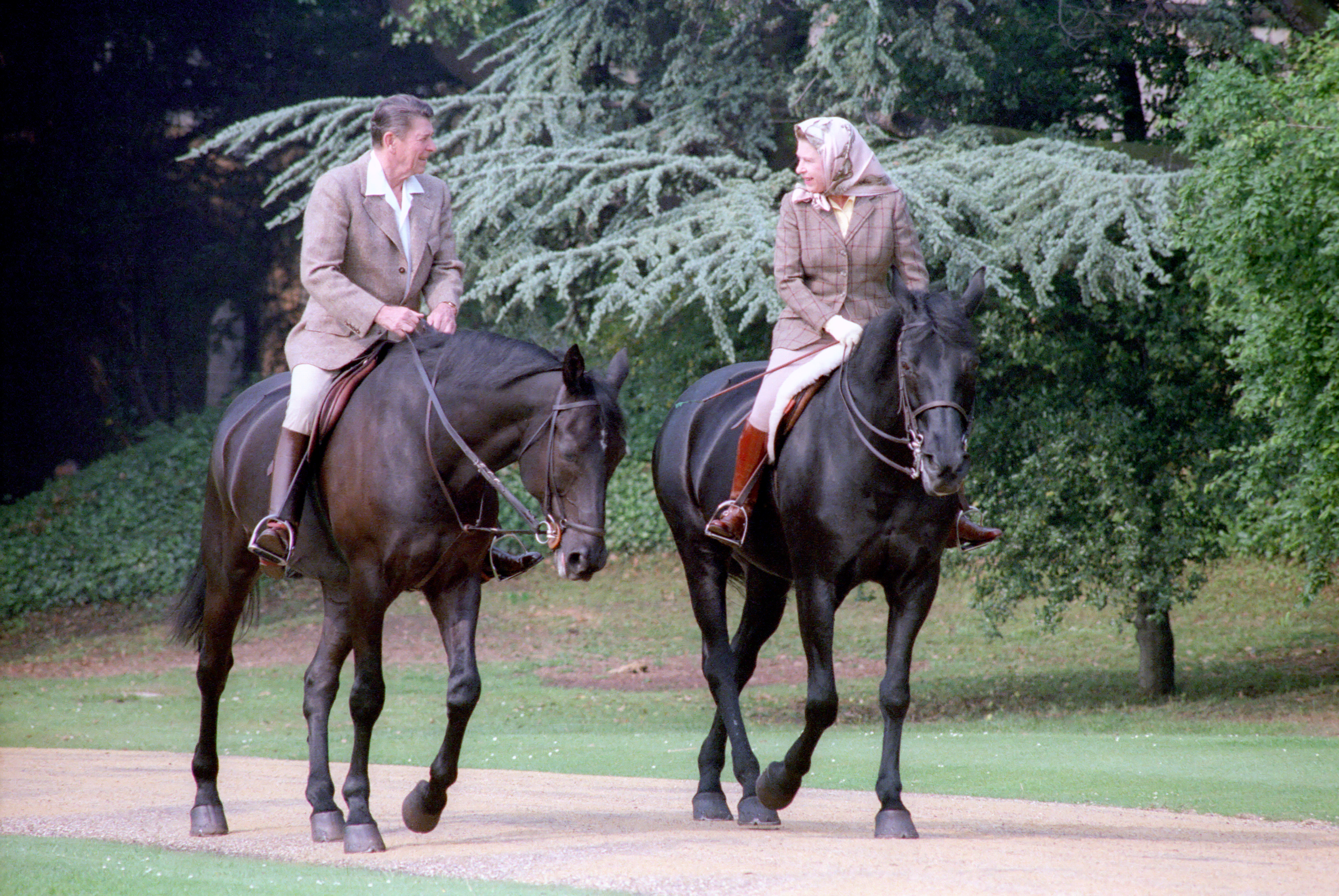
Queen Elizabeth II and Ronald Reagan riding on horseback in the grounds of Windsor Great Park during President Reagan's 1982 official visit to the United Kingdom.

Queen Victoria created the park that still exists. The Windsor Castle Act 1848 was implemented to reform land use and rights around Windsor Castle. This led to the removal of existing roads and the creation of new ones to redirect people away from the Home Park.

During the 19th and early 20th century, one of the main events for farmers near and far was the Christmas sale of stock from the Royal Windsor Estates. Held on the same week as the Smithfield Show, buyers came from all over the country to buy something from the monarch. The sale in 1850 was held on 17 December by Messrs Buckland & Sons of Windsor. It included Superior Fat Heifers for £20 each; 10 fat ewes, fed by Prince Albert, for 33/10; Fine Old Wether Sheep, fed by the Duke of Buccleuch, for 40/6. The sale made a total of £226. On 12 December 1894, Messrs Buckland & Sons were proud to announce:

The Prince Consort's Flemish Farm
A Xmas sale of fat stock belonging to HM the Queen
ON WEDNESDAY, DECEMBER 12, 1894
At One o'Clock precisely
Carriages will meet the Trains at both Windsor Stations

=== Aviation ===
The Smith's Lawn area of the park began to be used for flying in the 1920s, an activity which continued in various forms until the early 1950s. Improvements were made to the grass landing area in the mid 1930s, when it was used by the Prince of Wales (later Edward VIII). He operated several different types of aircraft from here, including several types of de Havilland airplanes, ranging from Moths to Dragon Rapides.

On 29 April 1931, Gordon Olley landed a large (for the time) twin-engine Imperial Airways airliner, the Armstrong Whitworth Argosy ("City of Glasgow"), at Smith's Lawn.

In 2016, the Duke of Edinburgh unveiled a memorial at Smith's Lawn to its use as an airfield. He himself had made his first solo flight from there in 1952, after regular use of the site as an airfield had ceased.

=== Second World War ===
During the war, aviation related activities included a factory dispersal site (to minimize the risk of Luftwaffe bombing) for Vickers-Armstrongs, who built and maintained Wellington bombers here. Other wartime aviation activities included use as a Relief Landing Ground for de Havilland Tiger Moth trainers at nearby No. 18 Elementary Flying Training School at Fairoaks.

The Smith's Lawn area of the park was also used for housing troops. During the 1940s, much of the deer park was ploughed and farmed for food, which involved the felling of hundreds of ancient trees. Over 200 large bombs fell on the land, including several V-2 rockets. During the 1948 Summer Olympics, the park was used as the road cycling venue. In the 1950s, the park was gradually turned into the recreation area open to the public that it is today. This involved the re-planting of Savill Gardens (which had been allowed to run wild during the war) and the new Valley Gardens. In 1951, a large wall for creeping plants was built at Savill using bricks from bombed-out London buildings. In 1958, a Totem pole was installed nearby, a gift from British Columbia to the Queen.

=== Protests ===
Windsor Great Park Regulations 1973 (Note: Section 1.)
- Statutory Instrument
- Parliament of the United Kingdom
- Citation: SI 1973/1113
- Territorial extent: United Kingdom

Dates
- Made: 26 June 1973
- Commencement: 27 June 1973
Other legislation
Made under	Crown Estate Act 1961

Status: Current legislation

Text of statute as originally enacted

In 1972 the Irish anarchist Ubi Dwyer organised the "People's Free Festival", the first of the Windsor Free Festivals in the park, attended by 700 people. A co-organiser Sid Rawle claimed that Windsor Great Park has been common land until the 18th century, and illegally inclosed (made private) by George III. Prince Philip, Duke of Edinburgh was reported to be "furious". Ubi and his allies repeated the festival in 1973 with at least 1,400 in attendance. In 1973, the Windsor Great Park Regulations 1973 (SI 1973/1113) were introduced. In 1974, 7,000 people turned up but it was violently broken up by police, who made 220 arrests, and the festival was banned. Dwyer was jailed the next year for distributing leaflets to promote another festival and Rawle was given three months for reproducing parts of Ubi's leaflets in the underground newspaper International Times.

== Features ==
The modern enclosed deer park is at the northern end of the Great Park. It is home to a large herd of semi-wild red deer, reflecting the original medieval purpose of the park.

=== The Long Walk ===
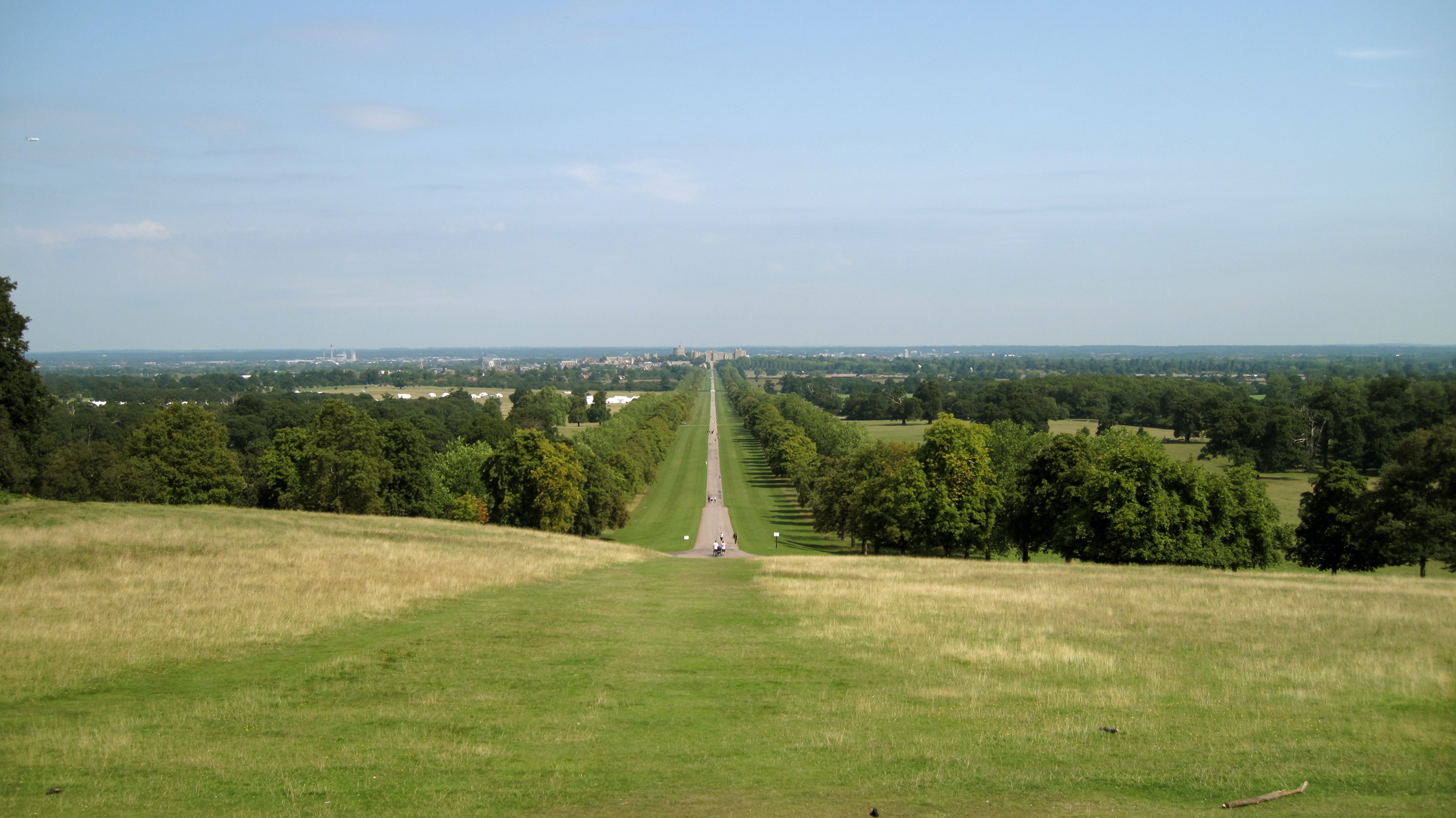
View of the Long Walk from Snow Hill, toward Windsor Castle

The tree-lined 2.64 miles (4.25 km) avenue known as the Long Walk was originally a path from Windsor Castle to Snow Hill. The high ground is said to have been the location where Henry VIII waited to hear the news that his second wife, Anne Boleyn, had been executed. Following the Restoration in 1660, Charles II had double rows of elm trees planted along the entire length of the path. The King was inspired to develop Windsor Castle and the surrounding parkland after he lived at the Palace of Versailles during his exile from Britain when it was the Commonwealth of England under Oliver Cromwell. The creation of the Long Walk was one of his first improvement plans.

In 1710 Queen Anne had the path through the centre of the trees replaced by a road so coaches could use the route to enter and leave Windsor Castle.

=== The Copper Horse ===
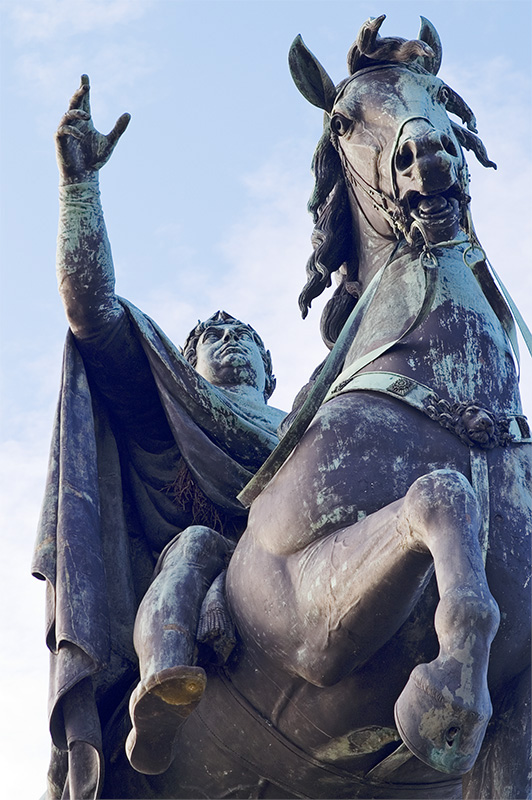
George III depicted as a Roman Emperor in the bronze statue The Copper Horse in Windsor Great Park

The Copper Horse is a statue of King George III atop Snow Hill. The cast statue, which was erected in 1829, is at the south end of the Long Walk, 2.65 miles (4.26 km) from the George IV Gateway at Windsor Castle. Other equestrian statues in the park include one of Albert, Prince Consort, to the west of the polo grounds, and one of Queen Elizabeth II near the Village.

=== The Royal Lodge ===
The Royal Lodge was built in the centre of the park as the deputy ranger's house. It was made into a retreat for the Prince Regent from 1812, but was largely pulled down after his death. The remains were renovated, in the 1930s, as a home for the Duke and Duchess of York before their accession as King George VI and Queen Elizabeth. From 2004 until 2026 it was the official residence of Andrew Mountbatten-Windsor. It is not accessible by the public.

=== The Royal Chapel of All Saints ===
The Royal Chapel of All Saints was built after the chapels of the Royal Lodge and Cumberland Lodge proved too small for growing numbers of household staff. The chapel was built in 1825 by Jeffry Wyattville and regularly used by George IV during the refurbishment of Windsor Castle. It was later remodelled in the Gothic Revival style by Samuel Sanders Teulon and Anthony Salvin. Queen Victoria often attended the chapel as did the Duke and Duchess of York before their accession as King George VI and Queen Elizabeth. It was regularly used by Queen Elizabeth II when she was in residence at Windsor.

=== Cumberland Lodge ===
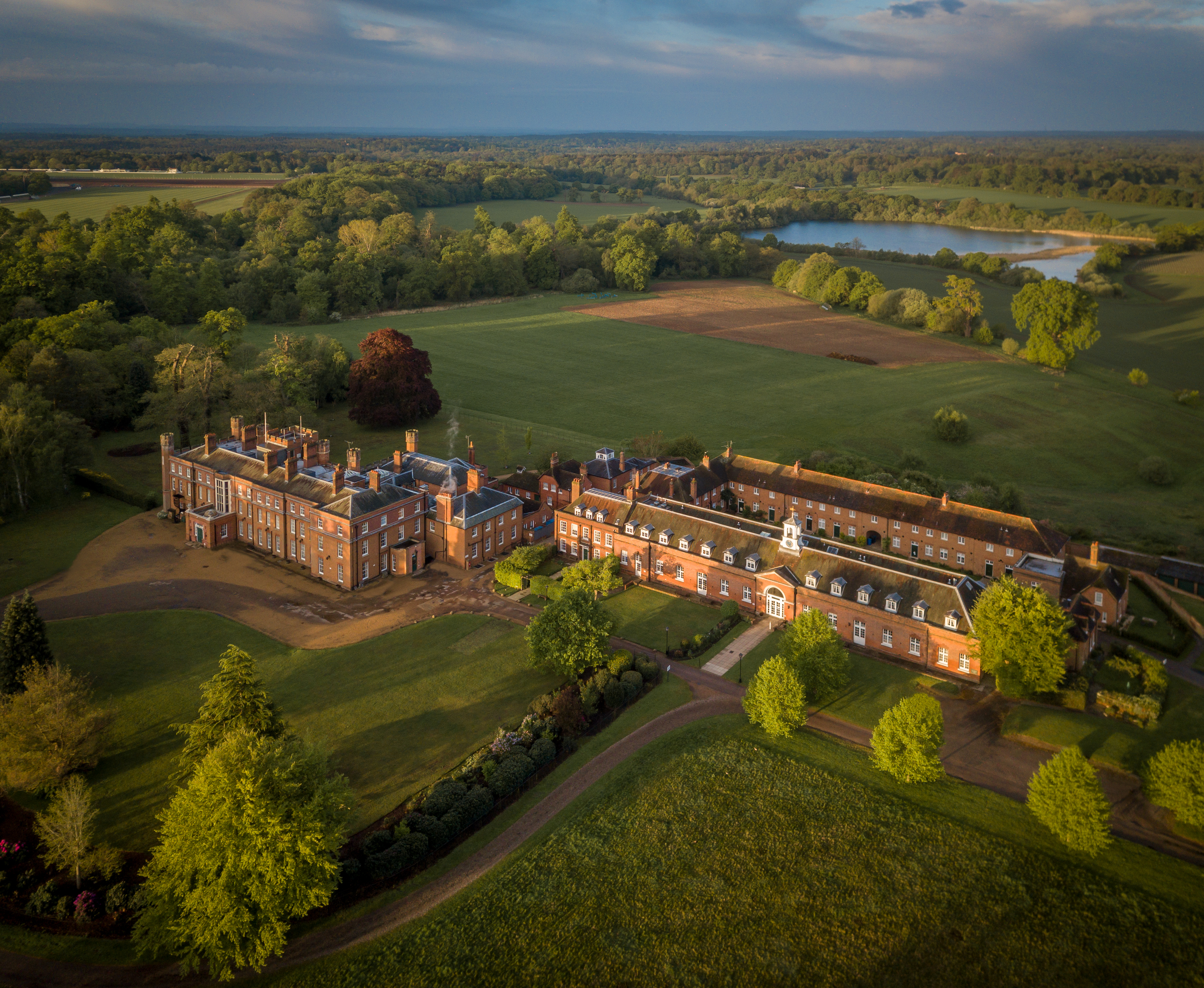
Cumberland Lodge, Windsor Great Park

Other notable buildings in the park include Cumberland Lodge, built in 1652 during the Commonwealth. After the restoration of the monarchy in 1660 the Lodge quickly became the home of the Ranger of the Great Park, an office in the gift of the sovereign. Each Ranger made his – or in one case, that of Sarah Churchill, Duchess of Marlborough, her – own mark on the features of the house and its surroundings.

Throughout her life Queen Victoria was a frequent visitor. Her daughter Princess Helena of the United Kingdom lived at the Lodge for over fifty years, presiding over elaborate re-building after a major fire in 1869 and extensive alterations in 1912. Lord FitzAlan, last British Viceroy of Ireland, was the last private person to be entrusted with the Lodge. It was in his time, at the Lodge in 1936, that the Prime Minister, Stanley Baldwin, discussed the crisis over King Edward VIII's desire to marry Wallis Simpson with the king's secretary, talks which led to Edward's abdication of the crown a few weeks later. In 1947, the King made the Lodge available to the newly established St. Catharine's Foundation, later known as the King George VI and Queen Elizabeth Foundation of St Catharine's. Today the organisation is simply known as Cumberland Lodge. Cumberland Lodge today is an educational charity dedicated to initiating fresh debate on questions facing society. The grounds are not generally open to the public, but the house is continually holding conferences, open days and lectures.

=== Cranbourne Tower ===
The private Cranbourne Tower is easily viewed from surrounding paths. It is all that survives of Cranbourne Lodge, the residence of the Keeper of Cranbourne Chase. It is thought to date back to the 16th century.

=== Savill Garden ===
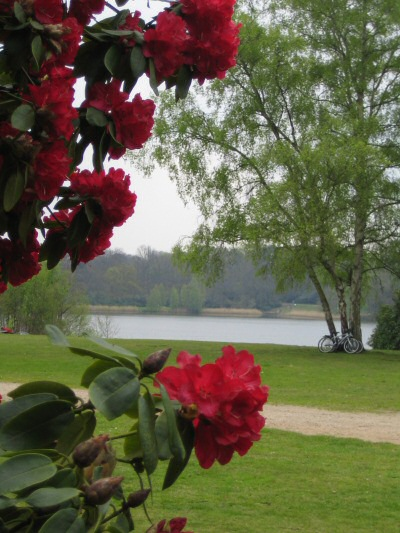
The Valley Gardens overlooking Virginia Water Lake

In the south-east of the park, near Englefield Green, are the Savill Garden Garden and Valley Gardens which were designed and built by Eric Savill in the 1930s and 1940s. They include an extraordinary range of flowers and trees from around the world. Smith's Lawn and Polo Grounds are also nearby, as is the tranquil Heather Garden. The Savill Garden Visitor Centre houses a gift shop, toilets, restaurant, coffee shop, ice-cream counter, and a shop selling many plants found in the garden. The gardens are open to visitors between 10:00 and 16:30 in the winter and 10:00 and 18:00 in the summer.

=== Virginia Water Lake ===
Virginia Water Lake, in the south of the park, is an artificially-created lake of around 1 km^{2} (0.4 sq mi) dating from the 1740s. Among the lakeside features are the 30-metre-high (100 ft) high Canadian totem pole, carved by Mungo Martin, Henry Hunt, and Tony Hunt Sr., commemorating the centenary of British Columbia, and a collection of ornamental Roman ruins, transported from the site of Leptis Magna (modern-day Al-Khums) in 1816 and installed at Virginia Water in 1826.

=== The Obelisk ===
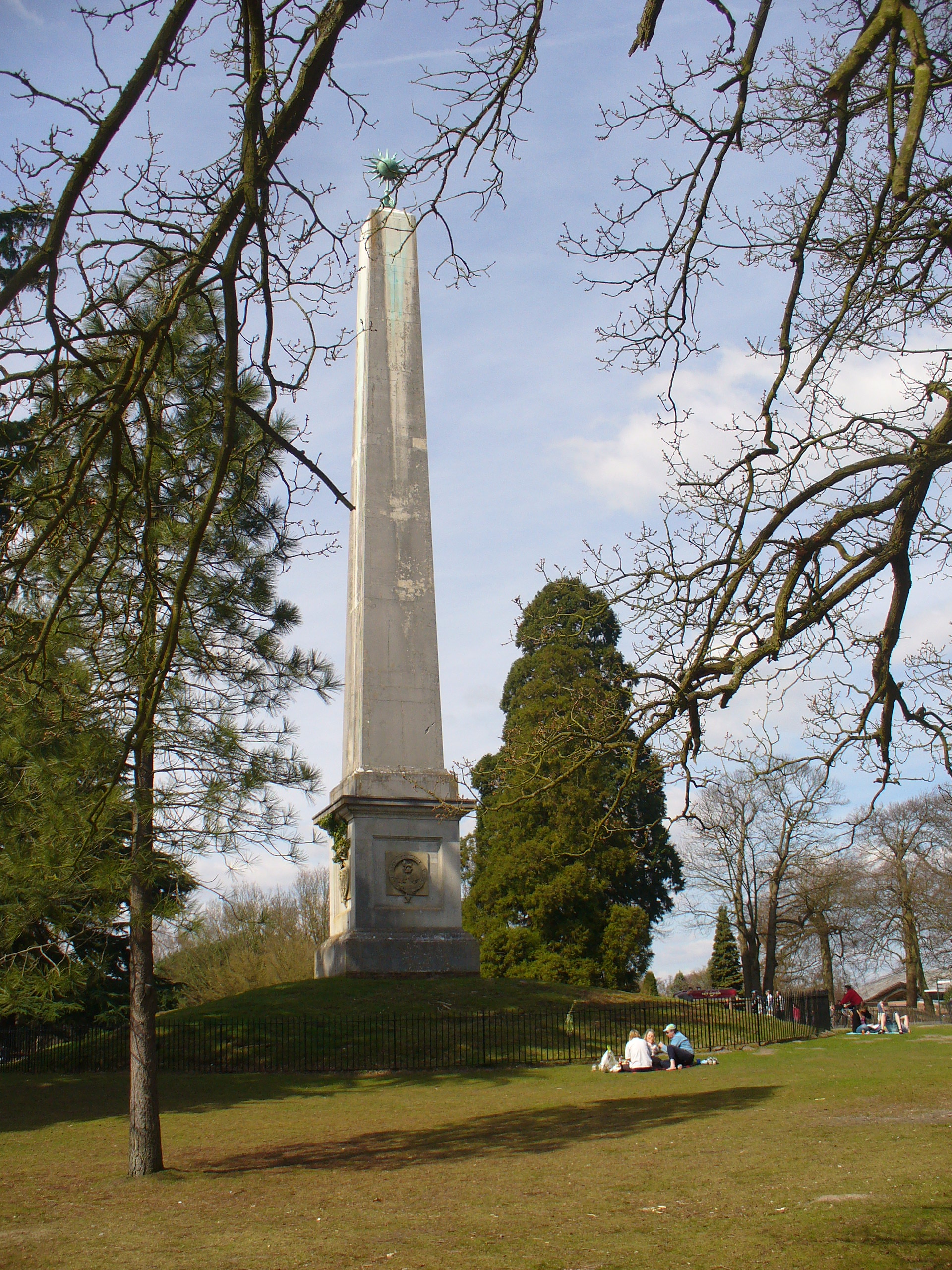
The obelisk memorial

Beside a smaller lake, known as the Obelisk Pond, is the Obelisk memorial to the Royal Duke of Cumberland, an 18th century army general. This is inscribed

This Obelisk raised by command of King George the Second commemorates the services of his son William Duke of Cumberland

The success of his arms and the gratitude of his father

This tablet was inscribed by His Majesty King William the Fourth.

It was originally inscribed "Culloden" but this was erased on Queen Victoria's orders and replaced with "Cumberland", inscribed within an inset in the masonry.

== Wildlife ==
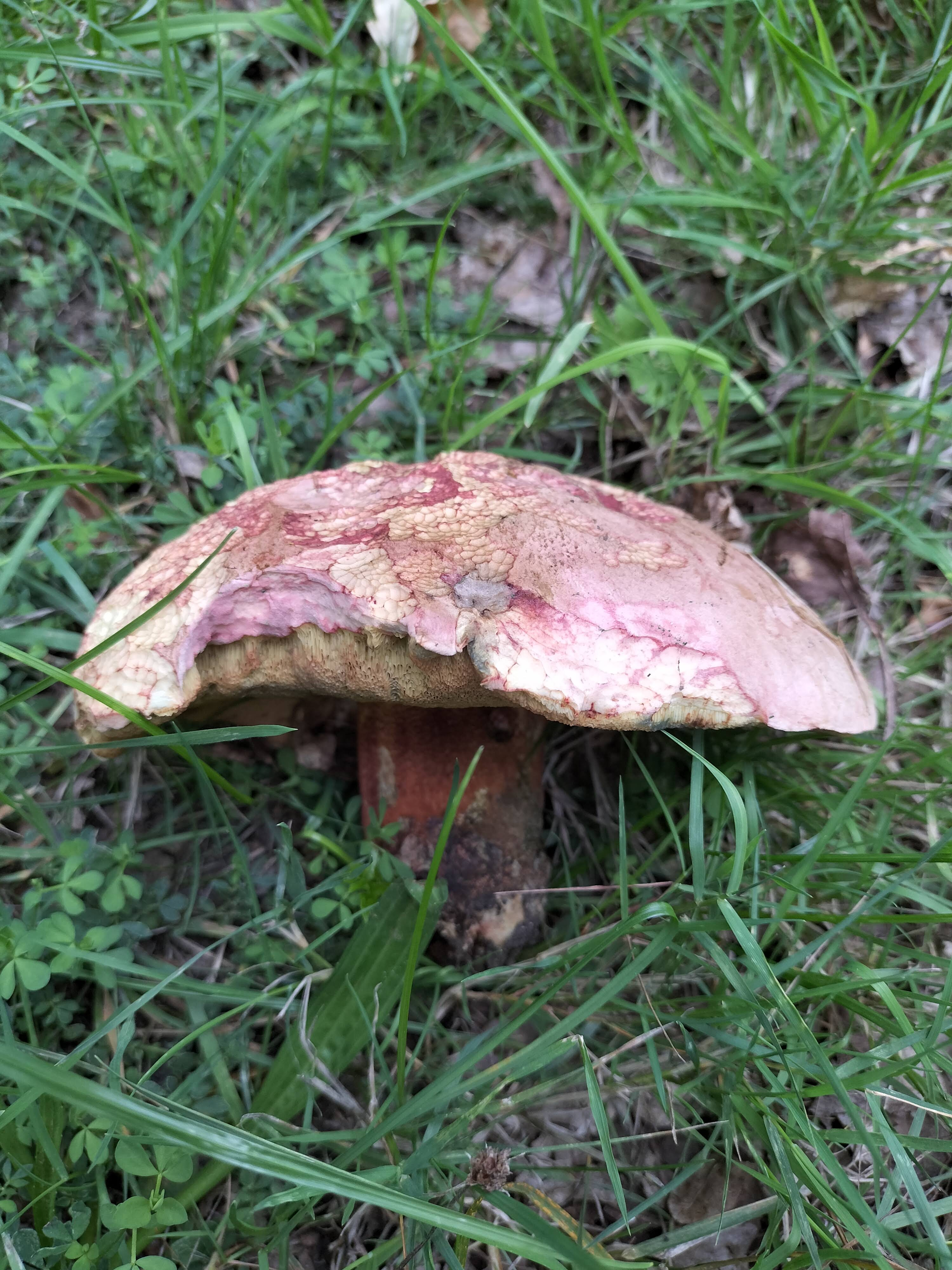
Rubroboletus legaliae from Windsor with unusual yellow pores, Windsor

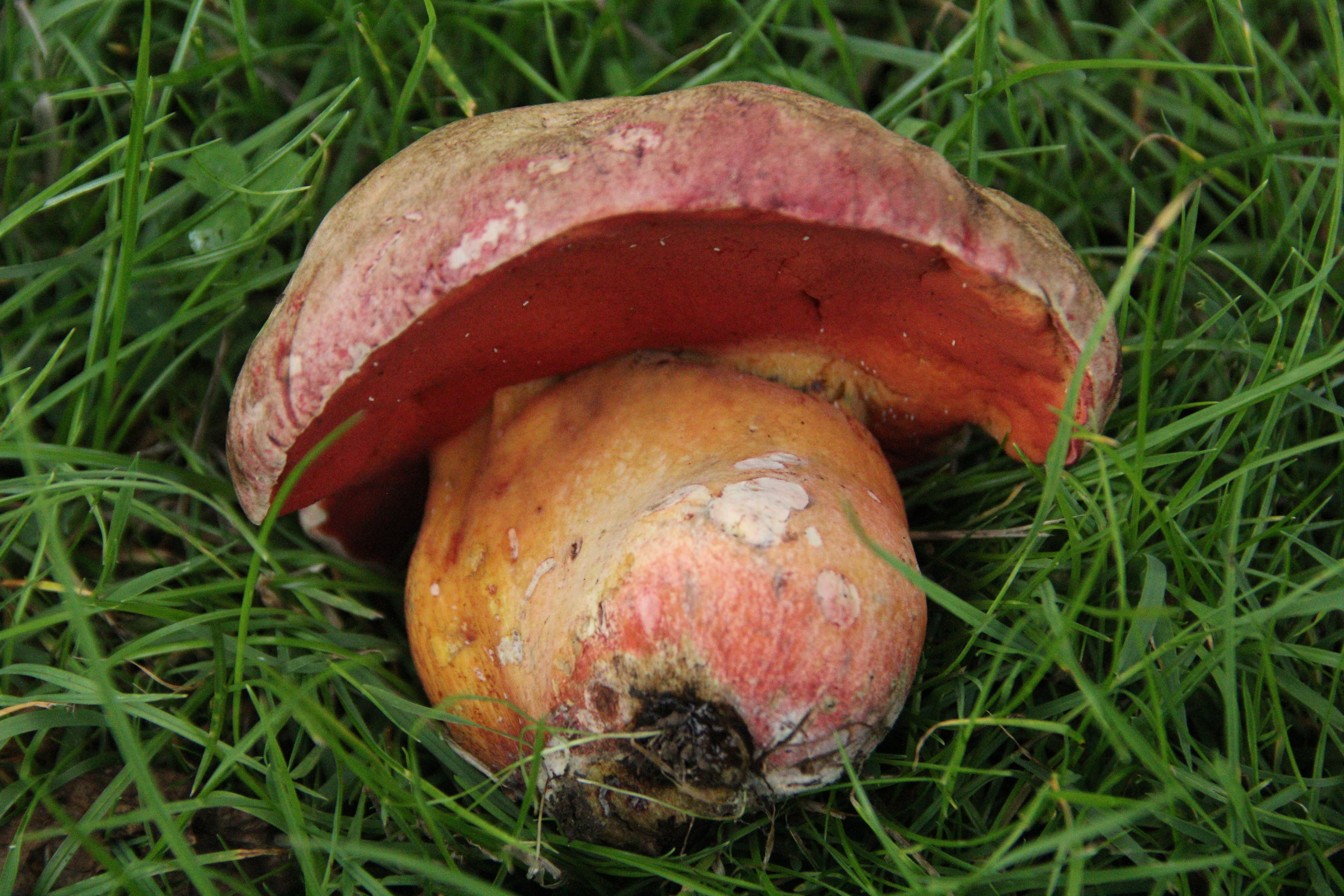
Rubroboletus legaliae from Windsor Great Park, Berkshire

Due to the presence of ancient trees and ancient grasslands, Windsor Great Park is an important wildlife site in the UK, and is nationally important for its fungal diversity. 250 rare species have been found in the park, some of which are confined exclusively to the park and occur nowhere else. Windsor Great Park is regarded as an important bolete site by mycologists, and a few nationally rare species occur here, including Imperator rhodopurpureus, Rubroboletus legaliae and Butyriboletus fuscoroseus, although the latter of which has not been encountered for many years. Windsor Great Park is the only place in the UK where a confusing form of R. legaliae with entirely yellow pores occurs, and is the type locality for Boletus immutatus, as suggested by Ainsworth et al. a variable colour morph of Neoboletus luridiformis with metabolic abnormalities, which occurs exclusively at Windsor Great Park and nowhere else in the UK, and has not been recorded in Europe as well. Collection of fungi for consumption has been long forbidden in the park to safeguard the population of rare fungi, with significant sanctions in place if this law is ignored, much like with Epping Forest. Other fungi which have been reported from the park include Boletus aereus, Gyroporus castaneus and six species of tooth fungi such as Hericium coralloides, a species protected by law in the UK. It is currently considered for inclusion in the Site of Special Scientific Interest (SSSI) register due to the diversity of fungi.

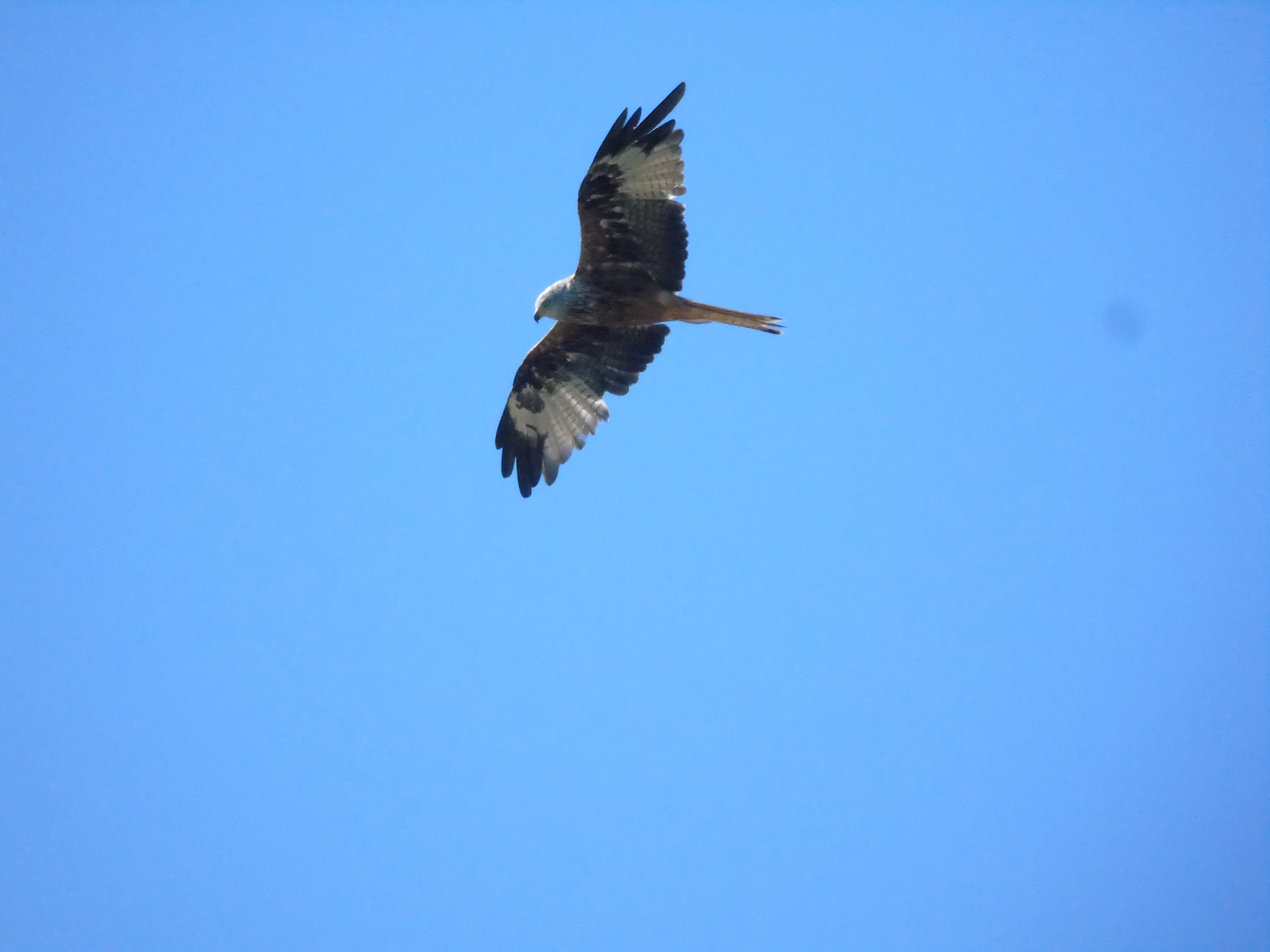
Red kite at Windsor

The park has a healthy population of red kite, which can be seen soaring all over the park on sunny days, and seeing and hearing ring-necked parakeet is commonplace. Other birds recorded from the park include the nationally threatened lesser spotted woodpecker and mandarin duck.

== Visiting ==
A new visitor centre designed by Glenn Howells Architects and Buro Happold was opened in June 2006, and was nominated for the 2007 Stirling Prize. Park access via Rangers Gate is strictly for authorised vehicles only. There are several other road, horse and foot entrances. Access to some of the private areas of the Great Park is available, on application, for an annual key rental fee. Access to the park is governed by Windsor Great Park Regulations 1973.

=== Events ===
Every five or six years since 1993 Windsor Great Park has been home to the Scouts and Guides camp WINGS (Windsor International Guides and Scouts camp), last held in August 2014.

At the 15th World Conference of WAGGGS it was decided to mark the centenary of the birth of Lord Baden-Powell, the founder of Guiding, by holding a World Camp with four locations — Doe Lake, Ontario, Canada; Quezon City, Philippines; Lac de Conche, Switzerland; and Windsor Great Park, from 19 January to 2 February 1957.

== Filming location ==
The Crown Estate has allowed the use of Windsor Great Park as a filming location. The park was used in the production of the following:

- Comedy film Carry On Henry (1971) featured Windsor Great Park & The Long Walk
- Elton John's 1978 album A Single Man featured the park on the cover and inner booklet.
- Lara Croft: Tomb Raider (2001)
- Thunderbirds (2004)
- Harry Potter and the Half-Blood Prince, Harry Potter and the Deathly Hallows (Part 1 and Part 2)
- Pirates of the Caribbean
- Robin Hood (2010)
- The King's Speech (2010) made extensive use of Cumberland Lodge.
- Snow White and the Huntsman (2012)
- World War Z (2013)
- Into the Woods (2014)
- King Arthur: Legend of the Sword was on location in the South Forest in February 2015
- The Huntsman: Winter's War used various locations, including Johnson's Pond
- Bridget Jones's Baby was filming on location on Duke's Lane in October 2015
- Flowers from Channel 4 was filming in December 2015 in South Forest and Penslade Bottom, and Windsor Great Park
- Cinderella (2015)
- The Legend of Tarzan (2016) included a scene at the Obelisk Pond
- Countryfile
- Midsomer Murders
- Goodbye Christopher Robin (2017)
- Scenes from the film Annihilation (2018) were shot in South Forest in April 2016
- Filming for the 2020 Disney film Dolittle took place here in June 2018
- No Time To Die (2021)
- Scenes from season 2 of The Lord of the Rings: The Rings of Power were filmed here
- Filming by Marvel-owned company For All Time Productions UK took place in the park in August 2025
- In 2025, a Hogsmeade Station set was built in the park for filming of the Harry Potter television series.

== See also ==
- Herne the Hunter
- List of ancient woods in England
- List of Sites of Special Scientific Interest in Berkshire
- The Merry Wives of Windsor by William Shakespeare
- Violet click beetle
- Windsor Free Festival
