= Marton Oak =

Ancient tree in Cheshire, England

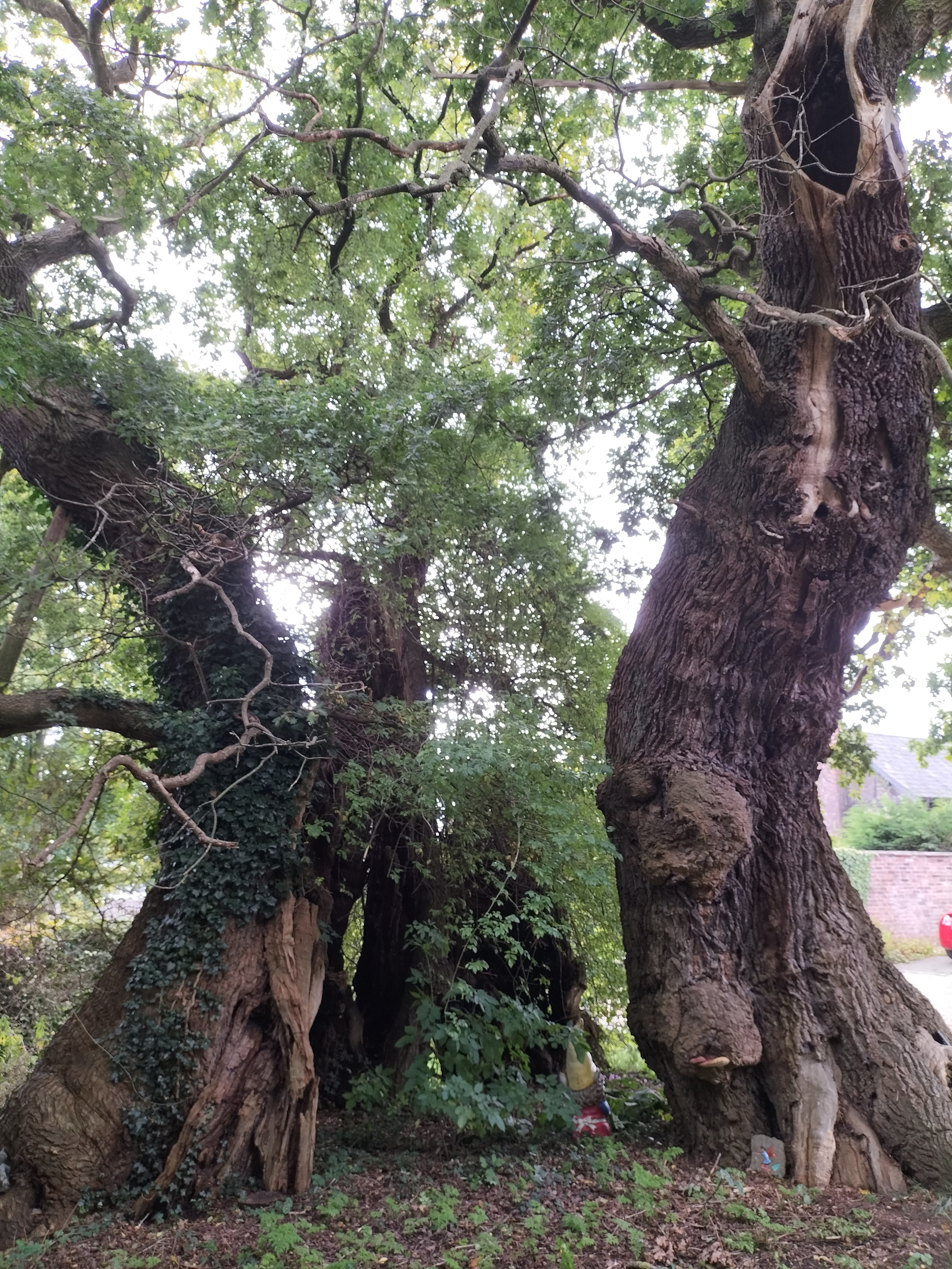
Marton Oak, looking south

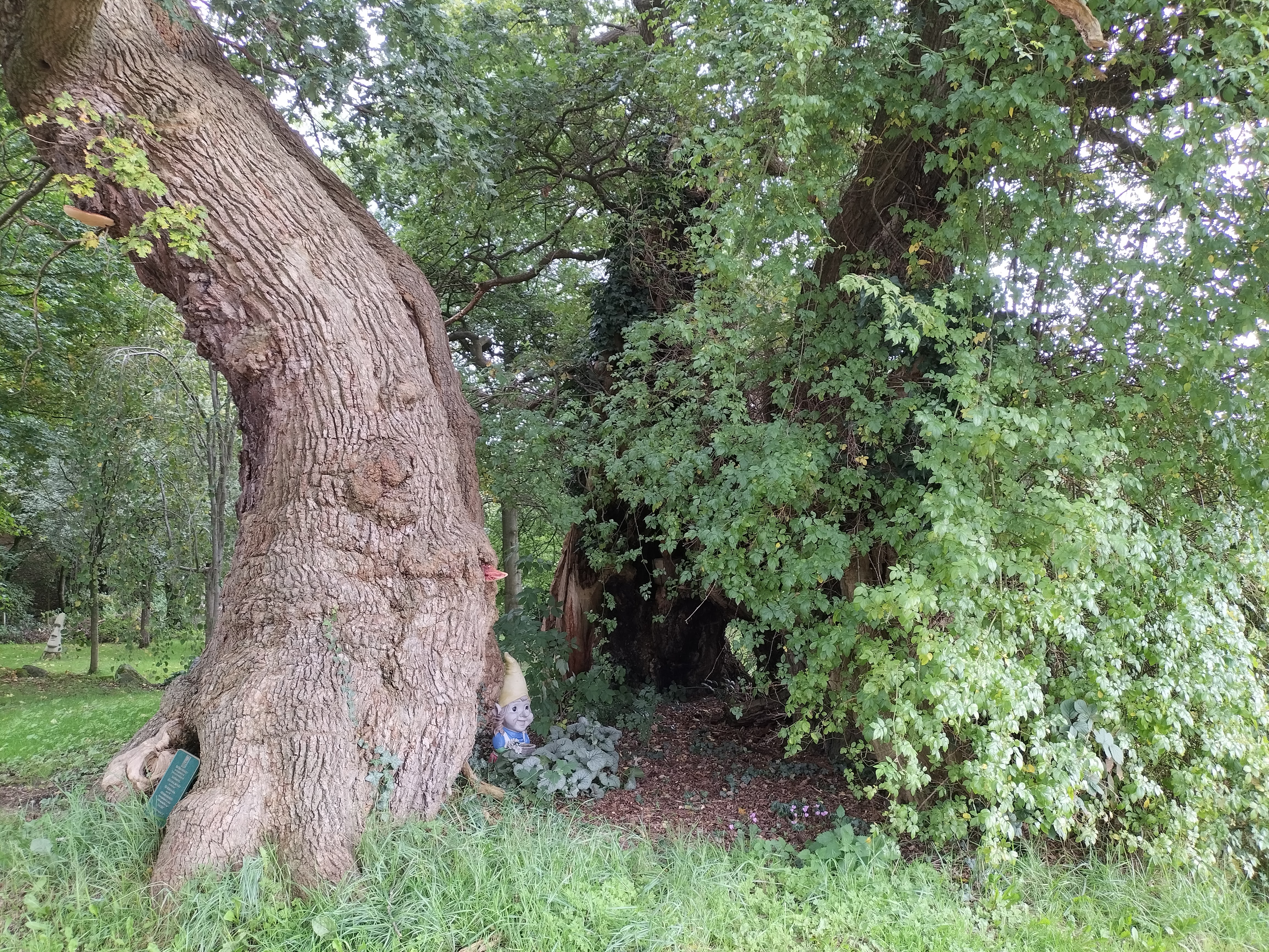
Marton Oak, looking east

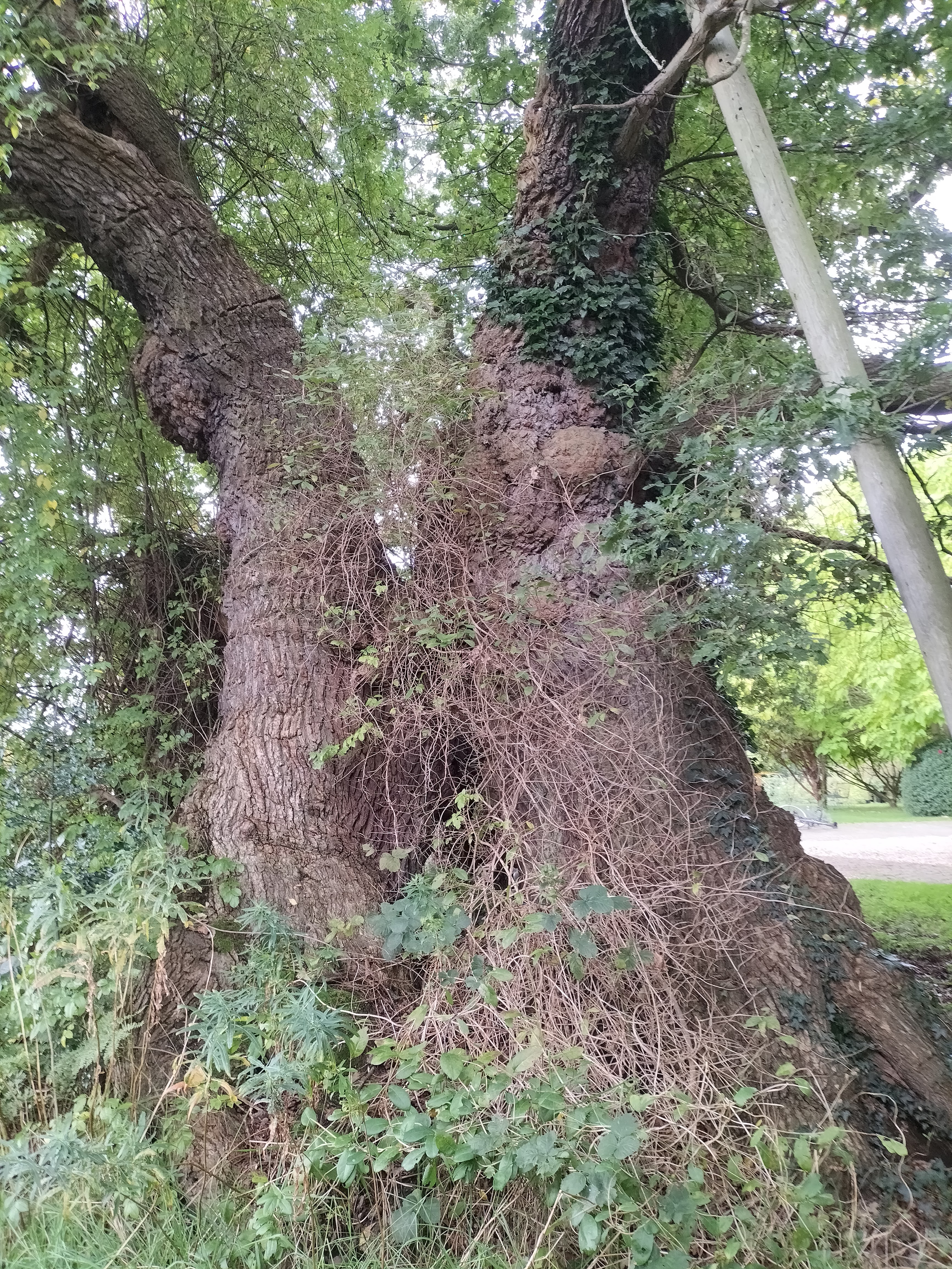
Marton Oak, looking west

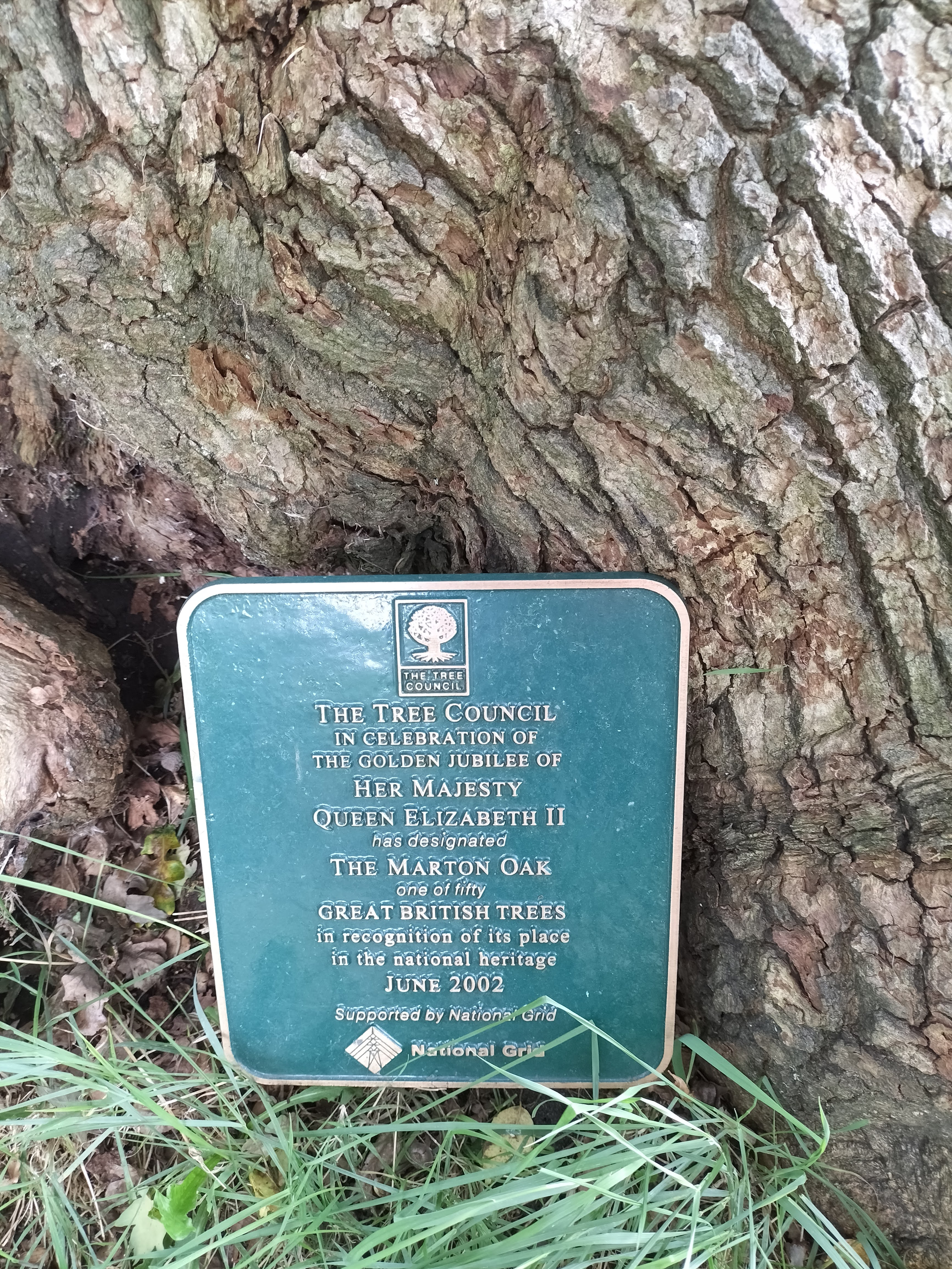
Information board

The Marton Oak is a large, ancient pedunculate oak (Quercus robur) in the village of Marton, Cheshire.

The tree's girth (as far as it can be called a girth, the tree being quite fragmented) was measured by Pollard (in August 2025) as being 14.6 metres (48 ft) at 1.5 metres (4 ft 11 in) off the ground, making it the UK's largest and widest tree since the collapse of the Newland Oak in Gloucestershire, surpassing trees such as the Bowthorpe Oak in Lincolnshire and the three large sweet chestnut trees at Canford School, Dorset. The tree is believed to be 1,200 years old, and is thought to be in the latter stages of its lifespan, as most of the heartwood has rotted away. The tree split into sections centuries ago, but they have one and the same root system. It is not known what the tree looked like before it split.

== Identification ==
For over 200 years this tree appears to have been misidentified as a sessile oak (Quercus petraea). In August 2025, Benedict Pollard, founder of Mighty Fine Oaks, was gathering acorns from the tree, with permission from the landowner, and noted that they were growing on long peduncles, and the leaves were mostly auriculate at the base – these characters belonging to pedunculate oak according to the botanical key to the genus Quercus in Clive Stace's New Flora of the British Isles (3rd edition, 2010). Aljos Farjon, author of Ancient Oaks in the English Landscape, had also identified it as Q. robur on a visit in June 2016. After discussing with Pollard, he notified the Ancient Tree Inventory who updated its identity on 12 December 2025.

== Health ==
Splitting is common in ancient sessile and pedunculate oaks, and poses no immediate health risk to the tree.. The tree looks in very good health as of August 2025, and had a crop of at least tens of thousands of good acorns in the 2025 'mast year'.

== Location and status ==
The tree grows on private land. Permission must be sought from the owner before the tree can be viewed. The oak has been registered as a Heritage Tree, a Tree of National Special Interest, one of the 50 Great British Trees selected in 2002, and is designated a UK champion tree for girth.
