= Lound, Lincolnshire =

Village in the South Kesteven district of Lincolnshire, England

Coordinates: 52.750790°N 0.416581°W

Lound
- Location within Lincolnshire
- OS grid reference: TF070182
  - London: 95 mi (153 km) S
- Civil parish: Toft with Lound and Manthorpe
- District: South Kesteven
- Shire county: Lincolnshire
- Region: East Midlands
- Country: England
- Sovereign state: United Kingdom
- Post town: Bourne
- Postcode district: PE10
- Police: Lincolnshire
- Fire: Lincolnshire
- Ambulance: East Midlands
- UK Parliament: Grantham and Stamford

Lound is a village in the South Kesteven district of Lincolnshire, England. It is situated about 2 miles (3 km) south-west from the town of Bourne.

Originally part of the parish of Witham on the Hill, Lound became part of Toft with Lound parish between 1866 and 1931. Since 1931 Lound has been part of the civil parish of Toft with Lound and Manthorpe .

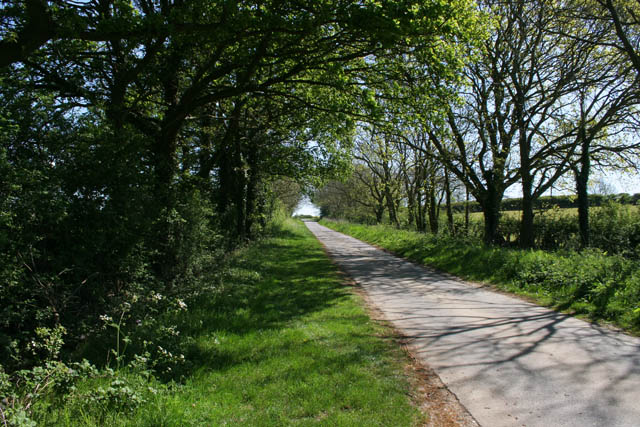
County road near Lound

At the time of Domesday Book of 1086, Lound consisted of 18 households, two mills, and a church.

Earthworks of the deserted medieval village of Bowthorpe are near the 17th-century Bowthorpe Park Farm.
