= Toft, Lincolnshire =

Village in Lincolnshire, England

Coordinates: 52.7423°N 0.4151°W

Toft
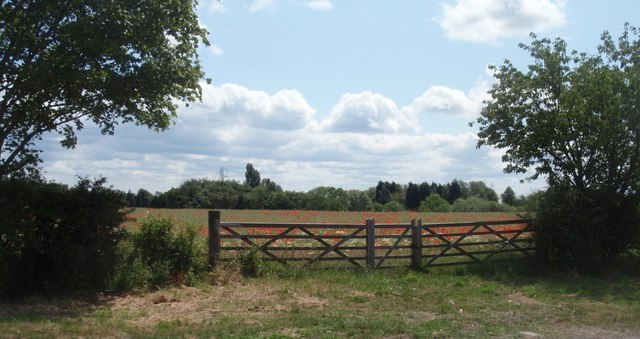
- Field in Toft

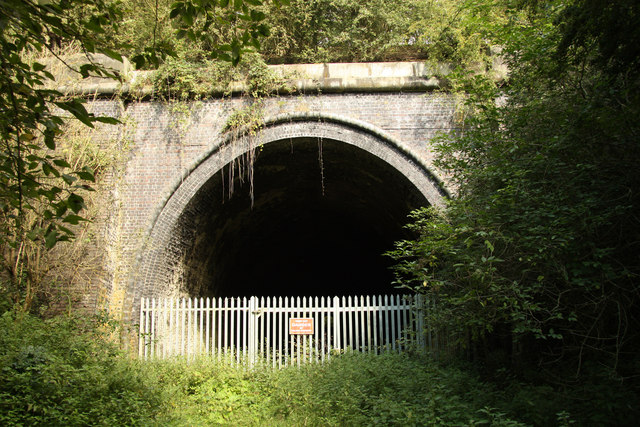
- Eastern portal of Toft Tunnel

- Location within Lincolnshire
- Population: 333 (2011)
- OS grid reference: TF069172
  - London: 90 mi (140 km) S
- Civil parish: Toft with Lound and Manthorpe
- District: South Kesteven
- Shire county: Lincolnshire
- Region: East Midlands
- Country: England
- Sovereign state: United Kingdom
- Post town: Bourne
- Postcode district: PE10
- Dialling code: 01778
- Police: Lincolnshire
- Fire: Lincolnshire
- Ambulance: East Midlands
- UK Parliament: Grantham and Stamford

Toft is a small village in the South Kesteven district of Lincolnshire, England. It is situated approximately 2 miles (3 km) south-west from Bourne on the A6121. Toft is part of the civil parish of Toft with Lound and Manthorpe. The population of the civil parish at the 2011 census was 333.

The village gave its name to the Toft Tunnel on the former Midland and Great Northern Joint Railway (closed in 1959), which ran about 1 mile (1.6 km) to the north. This was the only tunnel on that railway, which ran for the most part over the Fens. The tunnel is actually in Lound, though still in the parish. It is now managed as a nature reserve

Toft Hotel Golf Course is on the southern edge of the village. The East Glen river flows through the village, also to the south.

The north of the parish includes the deserted medieval village of Bowthorpe, now a single farm, which gives its name to the Bowthorpe Oak. Although there is no church today, some books about the history of Crowland Abbey say that the patronage of the church in Toft was gifted to the Abbey on the occasion of the start of its re-build in 1113 following the devastating fire of 1091.
