= Newland Oak =

Former British oak

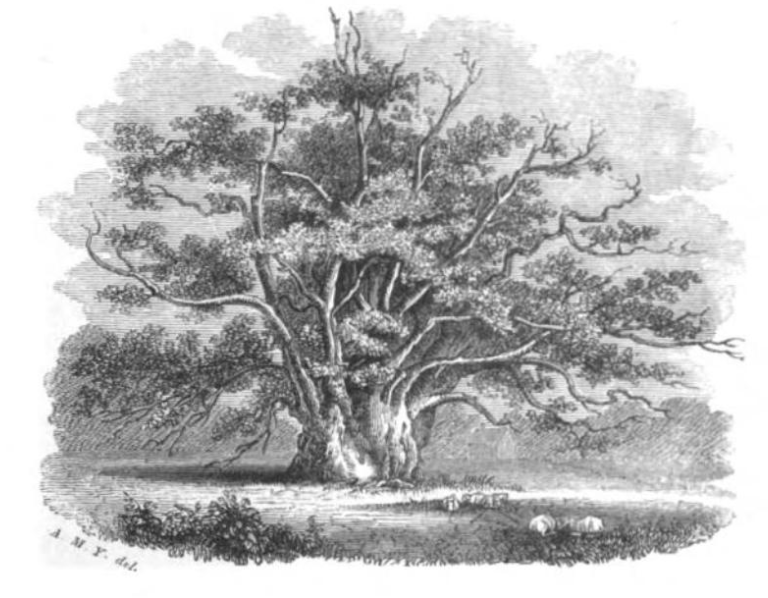
- An 1836 depiction of the tree
- Interactive map of Newland Oak
- Species: English oak (Quercus robur)
- Location: Newland, Gloucestershire
- Coordinates: 51.780°N 2.659°W
- Date seeded: c. 1000
- Date felled: 1970

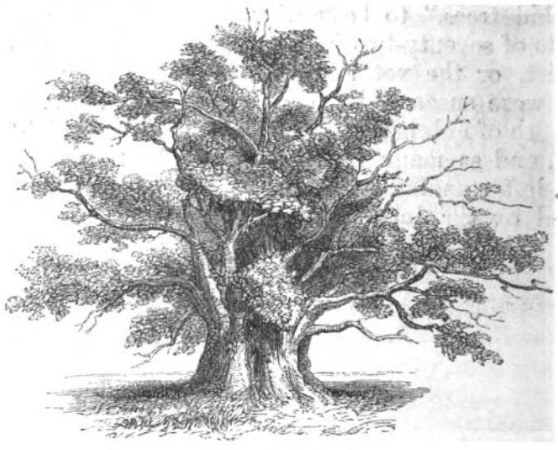
Newland Oak, 1858

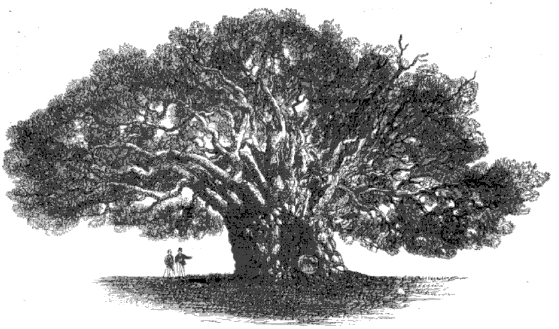
Newland Oak, 1875

The Newland Oak was a veteran oak tree in Newland, Gloucestershire in England. Originally part of the ancient woodland of the Forest of Dean, it survived clearances that created the settlement of Newland and was afterwards pollarded for timber. Its large size was often remarked upon through the years and it was considered a rival to the Cowthorpe Oak as the largest oak tree in Great Britain. Much of the tree fell during heavy snow in 1955 but a single branch of the tree survived until 1970 when it was killed during an arson attack. A replacement tree grown from one of the Newland Oak's acorns had been planted in 1964.

== History ==
The oak dated back to c. 1000AD and is thought to have formed part of the vast Forest of Dean, an ancient woodland covering much of Western Gloucestershire. The tree was an English oak, Quercus robur. Much of the forest was cleared in later years, from which the nearby settlement of Newland derives its name (as "new land" reclaimed from the forest), and in later years the tree stood alone in a field of Spouts Farm about 1 mile (1.6 km) north-west of Newland Church. The tree had been pollarded for timber and for centuries was known as the "Great Oak".

As one of the largest oaks in the country the tree was the subject of some fame. The antiquary John Timbs described it as "one of the most remarkable trees in the country" in 1839 and an engraving of the tree was included in P. J. Ducarel's De Wyrhale book of poetry in 1836. By 1874 the tree was said to be "battered and decaying", though naturalist Edwin Lees thought it might live another 500 years.

The tree was badly damaged by heavy snowfall in May 1955 which caused much of the structure to collapse and it was described as "long much-decayed" in 1964. One live branch survived but this was killed by an arson attack in 1970. A replacement tree, grown from one of the Newland Oak's acorns, was planted by Cyril Hart, verderer of the Forest of Dean, on 21 December 1964. The replacement tree survives and a partly rotten segment of the original trunk was still visible in 2011. Hart described the tree in 1966 as having taken "200 years to grow, 200 years to exist, and 200 to die".

== Size ==
The size of the tree, typically measured by its girth around the trunk, has been often measured and commented upon. It was measured at 41 feet (12 m) in girth in 1839 and in 1875, with a girth of up to 60 feet (18 m) was considered a challenger to the Cowthorpe Oak as the oldest in Britain. A 1906 measurement recorded 13.25 metres (43.5 ft) of girth and the 1911 Encyclopædia Britannica recorded 47 feet 6 inches (14.48 m) when measured at a height of 5 feet (1.5 m) from the ground. In 1931 it was recorded as 46 feet 4 inches (14.12 m) at a height of 1 foot (0.30 m) above the ground and in 1950 was said to be 13.72 metres (45.0 ft) in girth.

The Cowthorpe Oak fell in 1950 and by 1954 the Newland Oak was being described as having "the greatest girth of any tree in Britain". A Her Majesty's Stationery Office publication of 1964 recorded that the Newland Oak had the greatest girth of any tree recorded in Britain in modern times, but Julian Hight, writing in 2011, states that it was only the second-largest girth of an English oak (after the Cowthorpe Oak).
