= King Offa's Oak =

Ancient oak tree in Berkshire, UK

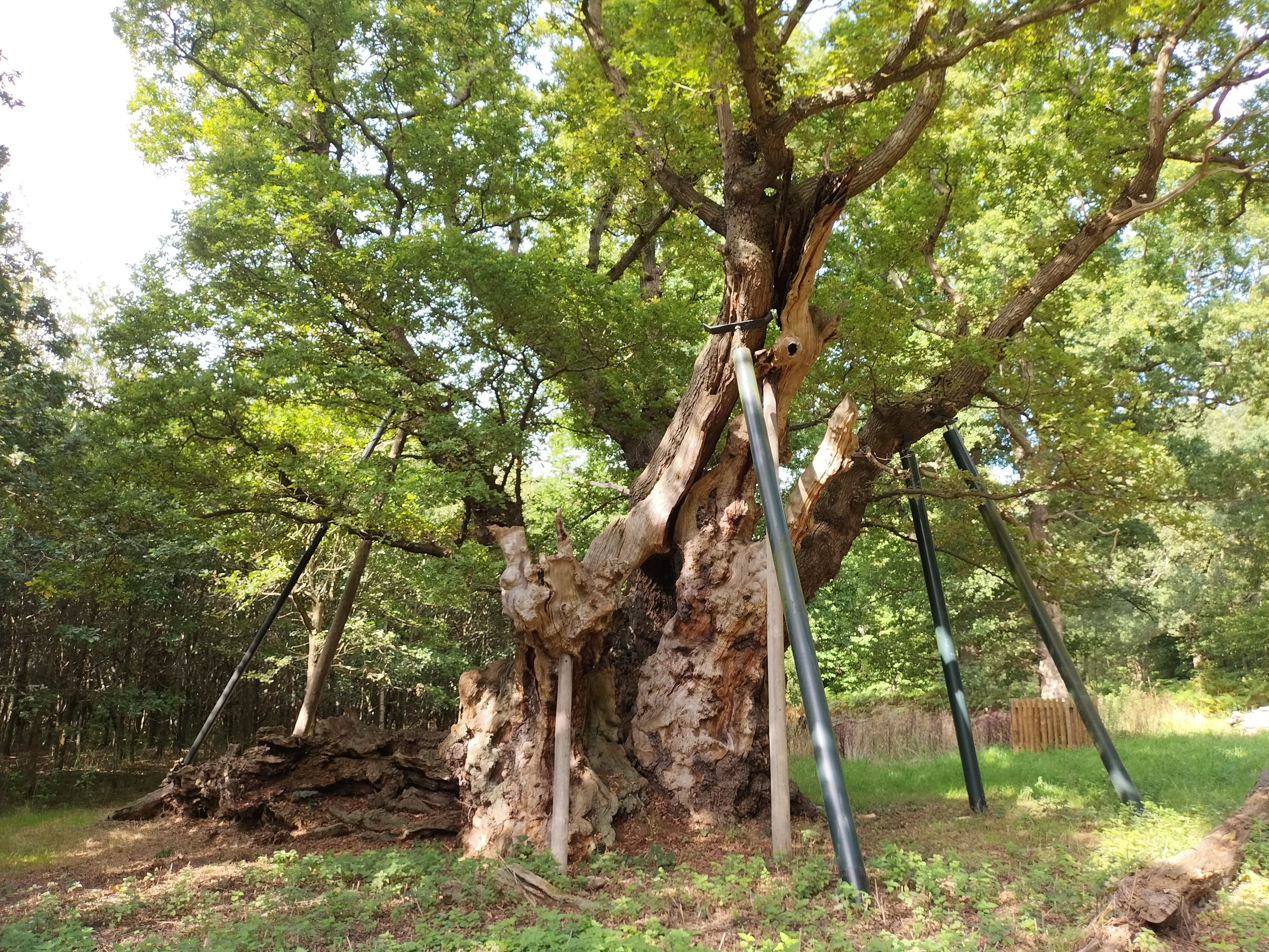

King Offa's Oak is a pollarded pedunculate oak (Quercus robur) which grows on the territory of Windsor Great Park, Berkshire, England. As measured in 1998, the tree was 11.18 metres (36.7 ft) in girth, and the trunk splits 1 metre (3 ft 3 in) above ground, leaving several large offshoots. In 2017, the height was measured as 16.5 metres (54 ft). The oak is at least 1300 years old according to experts and potentially as old as 1500 years. Both of these numbers would make the tree the oldest oak in the United Kingdom.

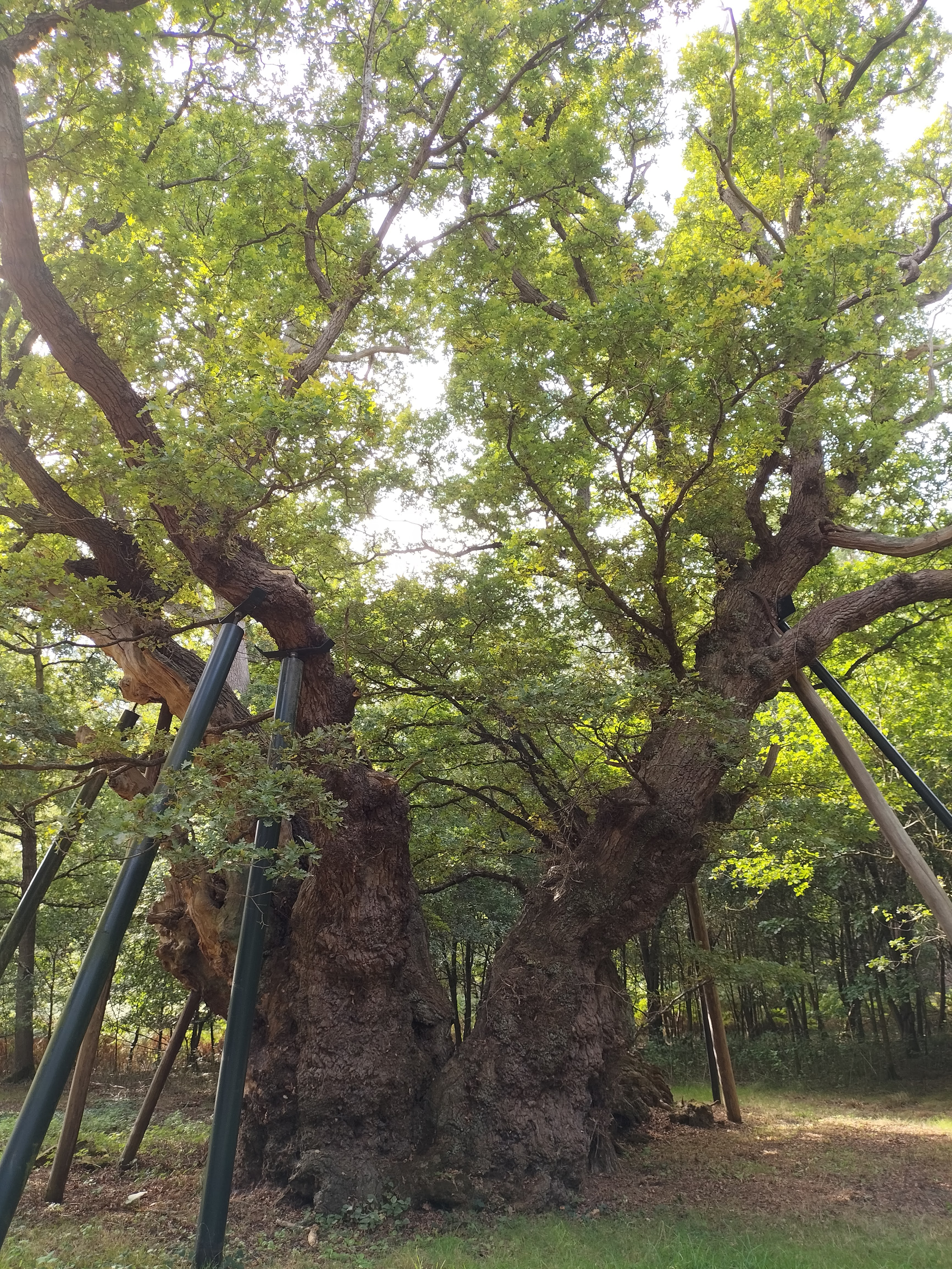

== Health ==
The tree split centuries ago, and a sizeable part of the trunk has died and fallen to the ground, whereas several other offshoots remain living. The tree has a live, vigorous top. Recently, fears were raised in regards to the tree's health if it got infested by the oak processionary moth.

== Location and status ==
The tree grows on private land with no public access at Windsor Great Park, and has been registered as a Tree of National Special Interest.

== See also ==
- King Offa
- List of Great British Trees
