= Bowthorpe Oak =

Ancient tree in Lincolnshire, England

Coordinates: 52°43′30.69″N 0°25′16.49″W

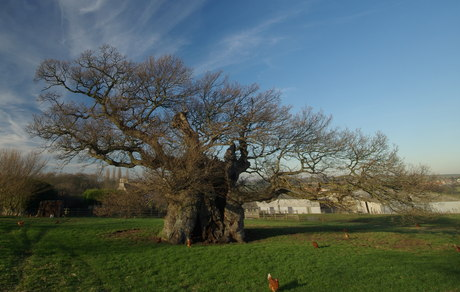
The Bowthorpe Oak

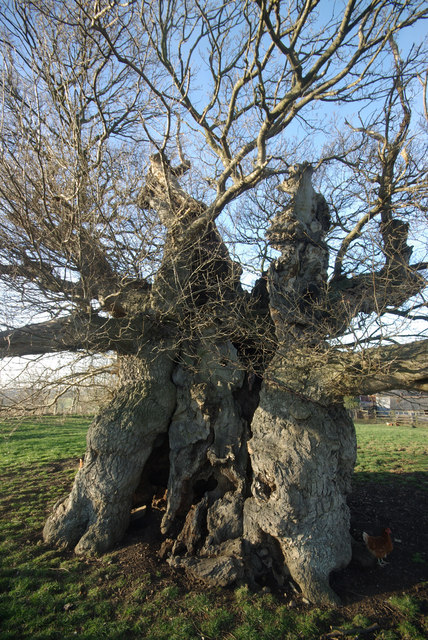
The trunk

Bowthorpe Oak in Manthorpe near Bourne, Lincolnshire, is a gigantic and ancient pedunculate oak in England. The tree has a circumference of about 44 feet (13 metres) and has a hollow trunk, making it the second-widest individual tree in the UK, only surpassed by the significantly older and much less-intact Marton Oak in Cheshire. It is commonly thought to be the UK's oldest oak tree on account of its size, although it is surpassed in age by the 1,200-year old Marton Oak, and the 1,300-1,500 year old King Offa's Oak at Windsor.

The tree can be found on Bowthorpe Park Farm. 'Bowthorpe' is the name of a deserted medieval village. The farm offers pre-booked private tours of the tree. The hollow interior of the trunk had been fitted with seats and has apparently been used as a dining room for 20 people in the past. The tree has now been fenced to protect the roots from soil compaction.

The oak was selected as one of 50 Great British Trees picked by The Tree Council in 2002 to spotlight trees in Great Britain in honour of the Golden Jubilee of Elizabeth II. The Bowthorpe Oak is featured in The Guinness Book of Records and was filmed for a short TV documentary about its size. It also appeared in the 2017 documentary Oak Tree: Nature's Greatest Survivor, hosted by George McGavin about the life of oak trees.

It was a filming location for the 2011 film Hollow, directed by Michael Axelgaard.

== See also ==
- List of Great British Trees
- List of individual trees
