= The Queen's Green Canopy =

Tree planting campaign across the United Kingdom

- Duration: 1 October 2021 – 31 March 2022; 1 October 2022 – 31 March 2023
- Location: United Kingdom
- Also known as: QGC; Treebilee
- Cause: Tree planting campaign
- Motive: Commemorate Platinum Jubilee of the Queen; Increase and protect the native tree cover
- Patron: Charles III
- Website: queensgreencanopy.org

The Queen's Green Canopy (QGC) was an initiative that began in May 2021 in the United Kingdom in honour of the Platinum Jubilee of Queen Elizabeth II in 2022. To increase and protect the native tree cover, people were urged to create this 'special gift' for the Queen, to mark her 70 years on the throne.

== Background ==
This initiative was led by Cool Earth in partnership with the UK Government and the Woodland Trust. Communities, charities, schools, scout groups, councils and landowners were invited to create a network of individual or specimen trees, tree avenues, copses and woodlands.

The campaign encouraged the planting of healthy native trees that would thrive, enhancing the environment and the landscape for generations to come. To help the environment and make local areas greener, people were urged to plant trees across the United Kingdom to create a lasting legacy in honour of the Queen's leadership.

Alongside this, 70 Ancient Trees and 70 Ancient Woodlands, including some trees more than 1,000 years old and many with links to historical events, were designated as part of the Canopy.

In a statement, Prime Minister Boris Johnson said:

"Trees have the potential to transform our communities, connect us with nature and provide homes for precious wildlife. They also have a huge role to play in tackling climate change as we build back greener from the pandemic. As we celebrate Her Majesty's incredible 70 years of service, I encourage everyone to get behind this scheme, and go ‘Plant a Tree for the Jubilee'."

The Woodland Trust supplied 3 million saplings free to school and community groups, and a pilot scheme to train unemployed young people to plant and manage trees was also created under the auspices of the London environmental college Capel Manor College. The initiative included both individuals planting trees in their gardens and the creation of avenues and copses. Seventy ancient woodlands and 70 ancient trees were also identified as part of the celebration.

== Launch and the Planting season ==
The Queen's Green Canopy was officially launched in May 2021, in advance of the Jubilee year of 2022.

The Queen and Prince Charles planted the first tree in March in Windsor Great Park. Charles called it a 'tree-bilee' in a video message and also emphasised the importance of planting the right species in useful places. The two planted another tree at Balmoral Castle on 1 October 2021 to mark the official beginning of the initiative. On 3 October 2021, the first overseas Jubilee Tree was planted by Princess Anne at Hôtel de Charost, residence of the British Ambassador to France. On 30 November 2021, Prince Richard planted the final tree in Rutland's Duke of Edinburgh Memorial Orchard, which was created as a tribute to Prince Philip and is part of the Queen's Green Canopy initiative.

As of January 2022, about 60,000 trees had been planted to mark the Jubilee.

More than one million trees were planted during the first official planting season from October to March. The Countess of Wessex and Forfar planted an elm tree in the Buckingham Palace Garden to mark the end of first planting season. In a message marking the end of the first planting season, the Queen said that she was "deeply touched" by the planting of trees in huge numbers and hoped that the "Jubilee trees flourish and grow for many years to come, for future generations to enjoy". A 70 ft (21 m) sculpture called 'Tree of Trees' was set up in front of Buckingham Palace for the June celebrations. The sculpture, comprising 350 native British trees assembled into a single giant tree, was designed to represent the over one million trees planted during the Green Canopy project. Individual trees will be donated to community groups for replanting after the celebrations.

The first tree planting season ended on 31 March 2022. The second season started in October 2022 and ran until the end of March 2023. King Charles III and Prince William planted one of the final trees at Sandringham House. By the end of the second planting season, three million trees had been planted.

== 70 Ancient Trees and 70 Ancient Woodlands ==
70 ancient trees and 70 Ancient Woodlands across the United Kingdom were dedicated to the Queen as part of The Queen's Green Canopy.

No	Name of tree	Tree species	Location	Nation	Notes
1	The Signing Oak	English oak (Quercus robur)	Windsor Great Park, Berkshire	England	900 years old
2	The Great Bressingham Oak	English oak (Quercus robur)	Bressingham Hall, Norfolk	England	Tudor-era tree
3	Chatsworth Alder	Alder (Alnus glutinosa)	Chatsworth Park, Derbyshire	England	One of the oldest alders in the country
4	Queen Elizabeth Oak	Sessile oak (Quercus petraea)	Cowdray Park, West Sussex	England	Around 1,000 years old. Queen Elizabeth I rested and took lunch under the Oak in 1591 during a hunting trip.
5	Doddington Sweet Chestnut	Sweet chestnut (Castanea sativa)	Doddington Hall, Lincoln, Lincolnshire	England	350–400 years old
6	Ullswater Silver Birch	Silver birch (Betula pendula)	Ullswater, Cumbria	England	Exceptional size and condition for its species
7	St Edward's Yew	Common yew (Taxus baccata)	St Edward's Church, Stow-on-the-Wold, Gloucestershire	England	One of two which frame the door of St Edward's Church in Stow-on-the-Wold
8	Lambeth Palace Fig	‘White Marseilles' fig (Ficus carica)	Lambeth Palace, London	England	Originally planted by Cardinal Pole, the last Roman Catholic Archbishop from 1556 to 1558
9	John Keats' Mulberry	Black mulberry (Morus nigra)	Keats House Museum, London	England	Found in the garden of Keats House Museum, where renowned poet John Keats is believed to have written some of his most famous poems including ‘Ode to a Nightingale'
10	The Raydale Holly	Holly (Ilex aquifolium)	Woldside Wood, Raydale Grange, North Yorkshire	England	Part of a collection growing as an ancient coppice in Woldside Wood
11	The Much Marcle Yew	Common yew (Taxus baccata)	Much Marcle Church, Ledbury, Herefordshire	England	Has a huge hollow which is unusual to see for an ancient maiden yew
12	The Royal Oak	English oak (Quercus robur)	Boscobel House, Boscobel, Shropshire	England	King Charles II hid within this tree to escape the Roundheads following the Battle of Worcester in 1651
13	The Great Veteran Lime	Common lime (Tilia × europaea)	Wrest Park, Bedfordshire	England	Planted around 1670
14	Osborne House Cork Oak	Cork oak (Quercus suber)	Osborne House, East Cowes, Isle of Wight	England	Planted on 4 December 1847 by Prince Albert at Osborne House, Queen Victoria's holiday home on the Isle of Wight
15	Restormel Sessile Oak	Sessile oak (Quercus petraea)	Restormel Castle, Cornwall	England	About 400 years old. It has links to the Civil War, and action took place in 1644 around the tree
16	The Hangman's Tree	English oak (Quercus robur)	Shane's Castle, Randalstown, County Antrim	Northern Ireland	One of the largest oaks on Shane's Castle Estate and over 350 years old
17	The Marriage Tree	Scots pine (Pinus sylvestris)	Finzean Estate, Banchory, Aberdeenshire	Scotland	About 100 years old and is on the list of Heritage Trees of Scotland
18	The Hirsel Tulip Tree	Tulip (Liriodendron tulipifera)	Hirsel Estate, Coldstream, Scottish Borders	Scotland	One of Scotland's oldest surviving tulip trees. It is thought to have been planted in 1742.
19	The Giant	European silver fir (Abies alba)	Ardkinglas Woodland Garden, Cairndow, Argyll and Bute	Scotland	Thought to be the largest silver fir in the UK
20	The Brahan Elm	Wych elm (Ulmus glabra)	Brahan Estate, Dingwall, Ross-shire	Scotland	Relatively scarce deciduous tree that supports abundant insect life in the forest
21	The Balmerino Sweet Chestnut	Sweet chestnut (Castanea sativa)	Balmerino Abbey, Newport-on-Tay, Fife	Scotland	Said to have been planted by Mary, Queen of Scots, in 1565. Dating confirms the tree to be between 390 and 425 years old.
22	The Drumlanrig Douglas	Douglas fir (Pseudotsuga menziesii)	Drumlanrig Castle Gardens, Queensbury Estate, Dumfries and Galloway	Scotland	Planted in 1829 and is thought to be the first Douglas fir planted in the UK
23	Dumfries House Sycamore	Sycamore (Acer pseudoplatanus)	Dumfries House, Cumnock, East Ayrshire	Scotland	Reputed to have been planted in 1599
24	Dundonnell Yew	Common yew (Taxus baccata)	Dundonnell House Gardens, Wester Ross	Scotland	Believed to be the second oldest yew in Scotland, after the Fortingall Yew in Perthshire
25	Coed Glaslyn Rowan	Rowan (Sorbus aucuparia)	Coed Glaslyn, Powys	Wales	Huge in size, which is rare for rowans
26	Curley Oak	English oak (Quercus robur)	Wentwood, Newport	Wales	One of the oldest oaks in Wales
27	Plas Newydd Beech	Common beech (Fagus sylvatica)	Plas Newydd, Llanfairpwll, Anglesey	Wales	Has a girth of over 10m. It looks as it is several trees fused together.
28	The Buttington Yew	Common yew (Taxus baccata)	All Saints Church, Buttington, Powys	Wales	Oldest known planting date of any yew tree in Britain. It was planted in 893 CE to commemorate the Battle of Buttington.
29	Llangernyw Yew	Common yew (Taxus baccata)	St Digain's Churchyard, Llangernyw, Conwy	Wales	Poet Margaret Sandbach of nearby Hafodunos Hall, described a funeral here in 1852
30	Prisk Wood Small Leaved Lime	Small leaved lime (Tilia cordata)	Prisk Wood, Monmouthshire	Wales	At first sight the trunks appear to be separate trees but in fact it is all one individual.
31	Newtown Wild Black Poplar	Wild black poplar (Populus nigra ssp. betulifolia)	Newtown Y Drenewydd, Powys	Wales	One of the largest wild black poplar recorded among only around 7,000 remaining in the UK
32	Wyesham Oak	English oak (Quercus robur)	Wyesham, Monmouthshire	Wales	Thought to have been growing around the time of Geoffrey of Monmouth's birth circa 1095
33	Pulpit Yew	Common yew (Taxus baccata)	St James Churchyard, Nantglyn, Denbighshire	Wales	John Wesley, founder of the Methodist Church, preached from here
34	Vangarde Crack Willow	Crack willow (Salix fragilis)	Vangarde Shopping Centre, York, North Yorkshire	England	One of the largest crack willows in the UK with a girth of 7.8m
35	The Preston Twin Elm	English Elm (Ulmus procera)	Preston Park, Brighton and Hove, East Sussex	England	Around 400 years old
36	Crom Yew	Common yew (Taxus baccata)	Crom Castle, Newtownbutler, County Fermanagh	Northern Ireland	The Crom Yew is two yews entwined together, one male and one female.
37	The Ashbrittle Yew	Common yew (Taxus baccata)	St John the Baptist Church, Tiverton, Devon	England	Certified as 3,000 years old
38	Camusnagaul Pollarded Oak	Sessile oak (Quercus petraea)	Achaphubuil, Lochaber, The Highlands	Scotland	Composed largely of downy birch and sessile oak with both shrubby and moss ground flora
39	The Old Spanish Chestnut	Sweet chestnut (Castanea sativa)	Castle Leod, Ross-shire	Scotland	Planted in 1553 to commemorate a visit by Marie de Guise, Queen of France, and the granting of sasines by Mary, Queen of Scots.
40	The Defynnog Yew	Common yew (Taxus baccata)	St Cynog's Churchyard, Defynnog, Powys	Wales	Oldest yew in the UK
41	Maesgwyn English Oak	English oak (Quercus robur)	Maesgwyn Estate, Chirk, Wrexham	Wales	Thought to date back to the reign of Egbert, King of Wessex, in 802
42	The St Andrews Holm Oak	Holm oak (Quercus ilex)	University of St Andrews, Fife	Scotland	Core dating puts the origins of this tree at around 1740
43	Hafod Beech	Common beech (Fagus sylvatica)	Hafod Uchtryd, Ceredigion	Wales	Likely to be one of the millions of trees planted by Thomas Johnes
44	Drumlanrig Sycamore	Sycamore (Acer pseudoplatanus)	Drumlanrig Castle, Dumfries and Galloway	Scotland	One of the largest sycamore trees in the UK
45	Niel Gow's Oak	Sessile oak (Quercus petraea)	Craigvinean Forest, Perth and Kinross	Scotland	This tree was likely planted by the “Planting” Dukes of Atholl around 300 years ago
46	The Drumtochty Spruce	Sitka spruce (Picea sitchensis)	Drumtochty Castle, Kincardineshire	Scotland	One of the first sitka spruce planted in Europe, and one of the tallest in Scotland
47	Torphichen Horse Chestnut	European horse chestnut (Aesculus hippocastanum)	Torphichen Churchyard, West Lothian	Scotland	Located in the churchyard of Torphichen Kirk
48	Hopetoun Field Maple	Field maple (Acer campestre)	Hopetoun House, West Lothian	Scotland	Located in Hopetoun House's West Park
49	Tilgate Hawthorn	Common hawthorn (Crataegus monogyna)	Tilgate, West Sussex	England	The trunk of the tree is hollow and split as if cleaved by a giant
50	The Florence Court Yew	Irish yew (Taxus baccata 'Fastigiata')	Florence Court, Enniskillen, County Fermanagh	Northern Ireland	Thought to be mother to millions of offspring yews across the world
51	The Ankerwycke Yew	Common yew (Taxus baccata)	Wraysbury, Berkshire	England	2,500 years old
52	Hafod Sequoia	Giant sequoia (Sequoiadendron giganteum)	Hafod Uchtryd	Wales	The tallest tree on the Hafod Estate
53	Dundonnell Alder	Alder (Alnus glutinosa)	Dundonnell, Highland	Scotland	Large in size, not usual for alders
54	Antony House Black Walnut	Eastern black walnut (Juglans nigra)	Antony House, Torpoint, Cornwall	England	Planted in 1785
55	Parent Larch	European larch (Larix decidua)	Dunkeld Cathedral, Perthshire	Scotland	One of the largest European larch in the UK. Planted for Duke James of Atholl in 1738.
56	The Great Cedar	Cedar of Lebanon (Cedrus libani)	Painshill Park, Cobham, Surrey	England	Thought to be the largest multi-stemmed cedar in Europe
57	Plas Newydd English Oak	English oak (Quercus robur)	Plas Newydd, Llangollen, Denbighshire	Wales	Thought to be 400 years old
58	Eddington Veteran Oak	English oak (Quercus robur)	Turing Way, Eddington, Cambridgeshire	England	Estimated to be about 430 years old. Likely to have seeded around 1592 during the reign of Queen Elizabeth I.
59	The Tolpuddle Martyrs' Tree	Sycamore (Acer pseudoplatanus)	Tolpuddle, Dorset	England	In 1833, six agricultural labourers, later known as the Tolpuddle Martyrs, would meet at this tree to organise efforts to improve working conditions
60	Colesbourne Oriental Plane	Oriental plane (Platanus orientalis)	Arboretum, Gloucestershire	England	The tree has been recorded in a number of books, magazine and newspaper articles over many years
61	Robert The Bruce's Yew	Common yew (Taxus baccata)	Loch Lomond, Argyll and Bute, Stirlingshire	Scotland	Reputedly beneath this yew on the rocky outcrop of Loch Lomond where Robert the Bruce and 200 of his allies rested in the first days of their 14th Century campaign
62	Twisted Beech	Common beech (Fagus sylvatica)	Tehidy Country Park, Cornwall	England	Etched with graffiti, some dating as far back as the 19th century
63	The Original Bramley Apple	Apple tree (Malus domestica)	Southwell, Nottinghamshire	England	Considered king of the cooking apples and first cultivated in the UK
64	Sherwood Forest Crab Apple	Crab apple (Malus sylvestris)	Sherwood Forest Country Park, Nottinghamshire	England	Fenced off to aid protection against increased footfall
65	Baobab Plane	London plane (Platanus × hispanica)	Westgate Gardens, Canterbury, Kent	England	Largest example of the 'baobab plane' found in Canterbury
66	Newton's Apple Tree	Apple tree (Malus domestica)	Woolsthorpe Manor, Lincolnshire	England	According to scientific legend, this apple tree inspired Isaac Newton to develop his theory of gravity; a revolution in the history of scientific thought
67	St Melangell's Yew	Common yew (Taxus baccata)	St Melangell's Churchyard, Pennant Melangell	Wales	Thought to be over 2,000 years old
68	Willesley Park Sweet Chestnut	Sweet chestnut (Castanea sativa)	Willesley Park Golf Course, Ashby-de-la-Zouch, Leicestershire	England	Is of good height and girth
69	The Belvoir Oak	English oak (Quercus robur)	Belvoir Park Forest, Ulster	Northern Ireland	Estimated to be 500 years old and is possibly the oldest oak in Northern Ireland
70	The Major Oak	English oak (Quercus robur)	Sherwood Forest, Nottinghamshire	England	Standing for anywhere between 800 – 1100 years. It is the biggest oak tree in Britain, with a canopy spread of 28 metres, a trunk circumference of 11 metres and an estimated weight of 23 tonnes.

== See also ==
- The Queen's Commonwealth Canopy
- Queen Elizabeth Diamond Jubilee Wood
