= Digain =

5th-century Christian saint

- Born: 429 AD
- Died: Late 5th century
- Honored in: Catholic Church

Digain (also known as Dygain) was a 5th-century Welsh saint and Prince of Dumnonia (now the English West Country).

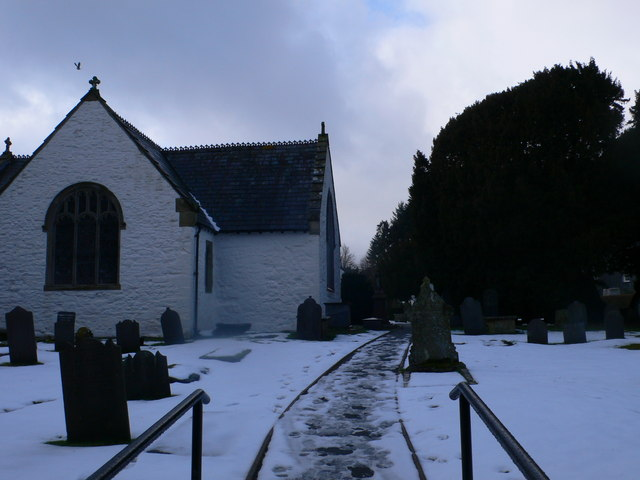
St Digain's Church, Llangernyw

== Life ==
Digain ap Constantine was said to be the son of Constantine Corneu, King of Dumnonia, and was born in c.429 He was believed to have had three brothers, Erbin (also sainted), Meirchion and Drustan, and possibly a sister (of unknown name).

== Sainthood ==
Traditionally St Digain founded the church of that name in Llangernyw, meaning "the church of the Cornishman", in the county of Conwy in Wales. The church was sited next to an already venerable yew, the Llangernyw yew. His sainthood was due being a confessor, meaning he was of remarkable virtue and confessed of the faith through writings and preachings, and has the feast day of November 21.
