= Erbin of Dumnonia =

English Catholic saint

Erbin of Dumnonia (Latin: Urbanus; c. 427 – c. 480) was a 5th-century King of Dumnonia (now Cornwall and Devon) and saint of Wales.

== Monarch ==
Traditionally, Erbin was a King of Dumnonia, the son of Constantine Corneu and the father of Geraint. He was the brother of Saint Digain, founder of the church at Llangernyw. Erbin succeeded his father as King of Dumnonia around 443.

Erbin chiefly appears in Geraint and Enid, one of the Three Welsh Romances of the Mabinogion. In the romance of Culhwch and Olwen he is the father of Gereint, Dywel, and Ermid, the latter two knights at Arthur's court at Celliwig. According to the Bonedd y Saint, Saint Cybi is Erbin's great-grandson through Cybi's father Salomon of Cornwall.

In the Mabinogion he appears as an old king whose realm is subject to attacks from his enemies. He recalls his son from the court of King Artu to aid him in the war and restores the Dumnonian power, then abdicates in his son's favour. About 480 Erbin dies.

The common calamint (an aromatic herb) is called in Welsh erbin.

== Sainthood ==
Erbin appears as a saint in the Bonedd y Saint and is traditionally associated with Erbistock in Denbighshire. His feast day is 13 January. Gilbert Hunter Doble suggested he might be the same as Saint Ervan/Erme of Cornwall.

Erbyn or Ervan is said to have been the father of Selevan. Erbyn is the original patron saint of St Ervan but in more modern times he has become confused with the Greek saint Hermes who is now regarded as such.

He was probably the founder of the church of Saint Ervan in Cornwall. In ancient Welsh calendars he is commemorated as a saint on 13 January or 29 May.
