= Robert Griffith (musician) =

Welsh harpist

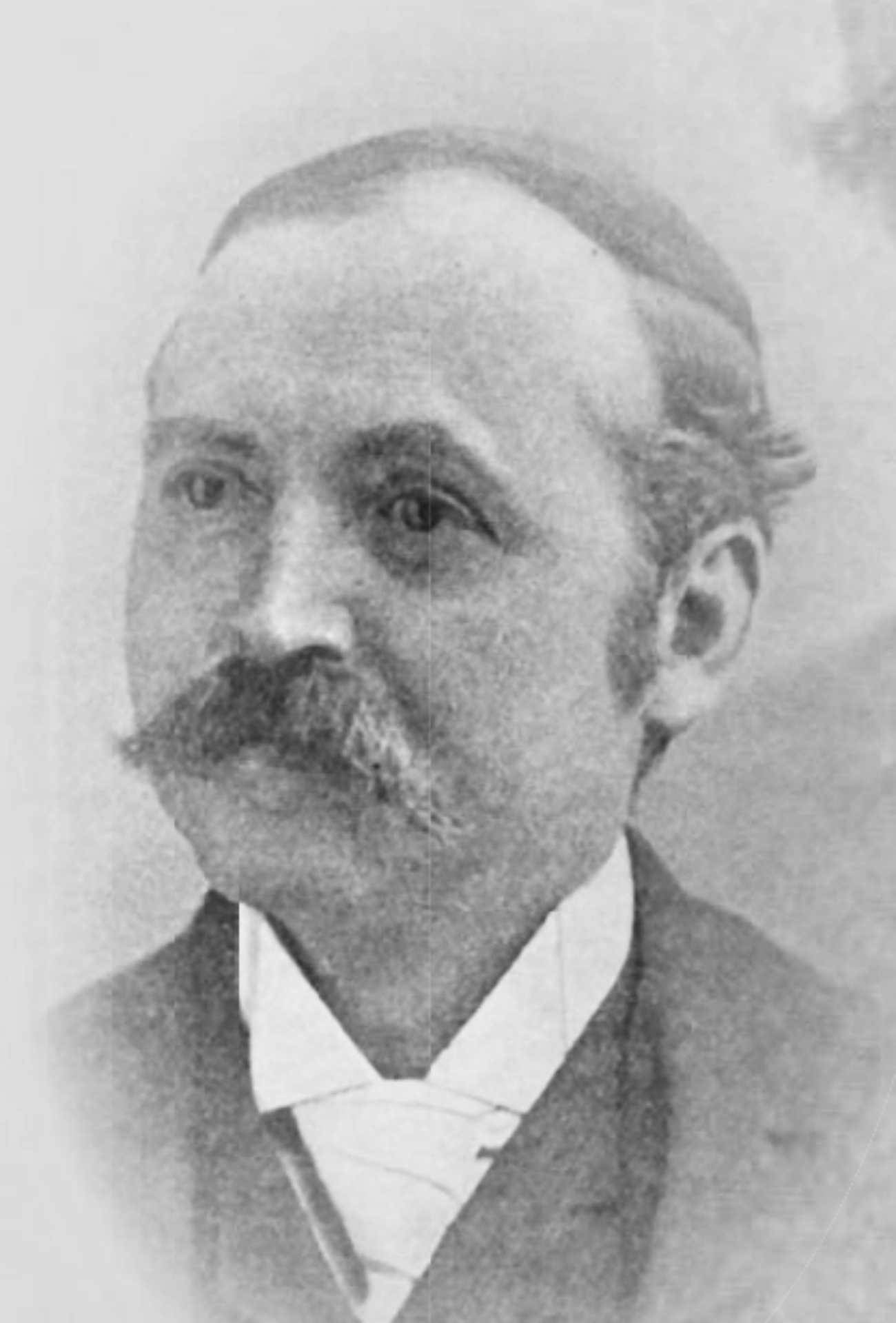
- Born: 1 March 1847; Llangernyw, Wales
- Died: 8 October 1909 (aged 62); Manchester, England
- Burial place: Manchester Southern Cemetery
- Education: Llanrwst National School
- Occupations: Harpist; Historian; Carpenter
- Spouse: Isabella Davies

Robert Griffith (1 March 1847 – 8 October 1909) colloquially known as Robin Telynor was a Welsh carpenter who worked for the Cheshire Lines Committee railway company in Manchester. He was also a harpist, verse singer and a historian of traditional Welsh music.

== Background ==
Griffith was born on the Glog Ddu farm from Llangernyw, Denbighshire (now Conwy County) as the child of John and Jane Griffith. John Griffith was a smallholder and servant to a noble family before he moved to Llanrwst to work in the lead works. He was educated at the National School of Llanrwst.

== Career ==
After Griffith left school he went to work with his father in the Nant Bwlch yr Heyrn lead works. He had a term of service at the Tyddyn Uchaf Farmhouse in Llangernyw, the home of the poets Richard Hughes (Glan Collen) and John Hughes (Ioan Cornwall). A year later he was a farm servant and the Stag Llangernyw pub; then he spent a term at Pennant Ereithlyn near Eglwysbach, as a house servant to the priest John Boulger. After his time as a servant he was apprenticed as a carpenter with Robert Roberts, Pandy Tudur, and after finishing his apprenticeship he worked as a carpenter in Llanrwst.

In 1872, Griffith moved to Manchester where he worked as a carpenter for the Lancashire and Cheshire Railway Company. In Manchester, he lodged with the famous harpist from Dolgellau John Johnes also known as Idris Fychan, who taught him to play the harp and sing verses.

In 1883 Griffith was ordained a musician by Arwest Glan Geirionydd with the poetic name Robin Telynor.

In Manchester he became friendly with Ceiriog, RJ Derfel, and other Welsh writers of the city. He was one of the seven who founded the Manchester Welsh National Association serving as the association's first treasurer.

Griffith was a collector of old letters and writings. He used his collection of antiquities to prepare lectures for many Welsh and Welsh societies. He used the fruits of his research to compose essays for competitive meetings. Some of the essays won the National Eisteddfod award. He won the National Eisteddfod of Wales in 1896, 1902 and 1908.

He wrote an autobiography, but it was not published. A copy of the autobiography has been preserved as a manuscript in the Bangor University Library. He labored diligently to compose a book on the History of the Interludes, but failed to get enough subscribers to publish it. The main work of his life was the Llyfr Cerdd Dannau, a comprehensive work about song, harp, and muse that was published in 1913 after his death. He labored diligently to compose a book on the History of the Interludes, but failed to get enough subscribers to publish it. The main work of his life was the Llyfr Cerdd Dannau, a comprehensive work about song, harp, and muse which was published in 1913 after his death.
