= Llangernyw Yew =

Ancient yew in Llangernyw, Conwy, Wales

Coordinates: 53.192333°N 3.685068°W

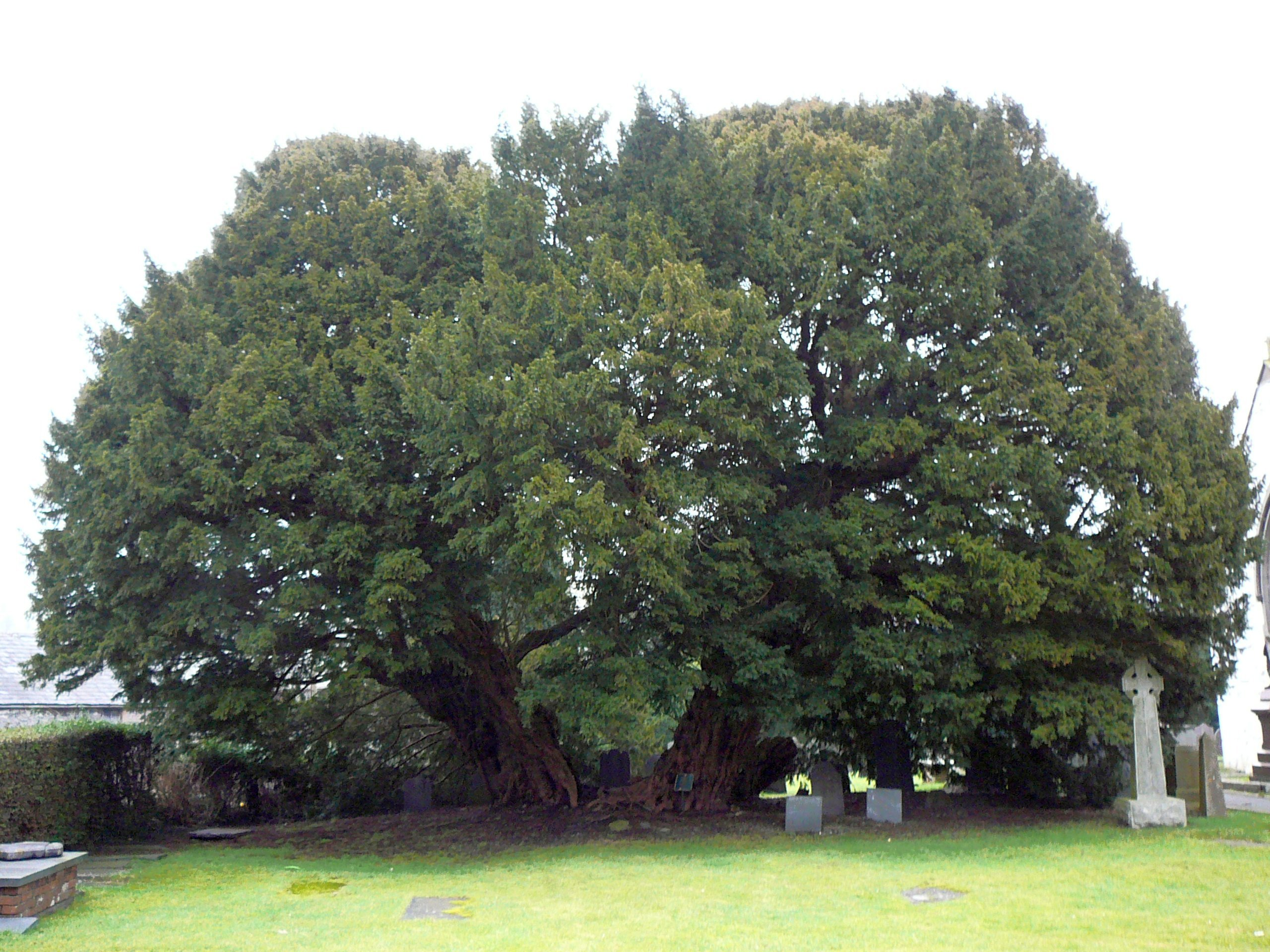
The Llangernyw Yew

The Llangernyw Yew (Welsh: Yr Ywen hynafol yn Llangernyw) is an ancient yew (Taxus baccata) in the village of Llangernyw (pronounced [ɬanˈɡɛrnɨu]), Conwy, Wales. The tree is fragmented and its core part has been lost, leaving several enormous offshoots. The girth of the tree at the ground level is 10.75 m (35.3 ft), and its age is unclear but probably over 4,000 years.

== History ==
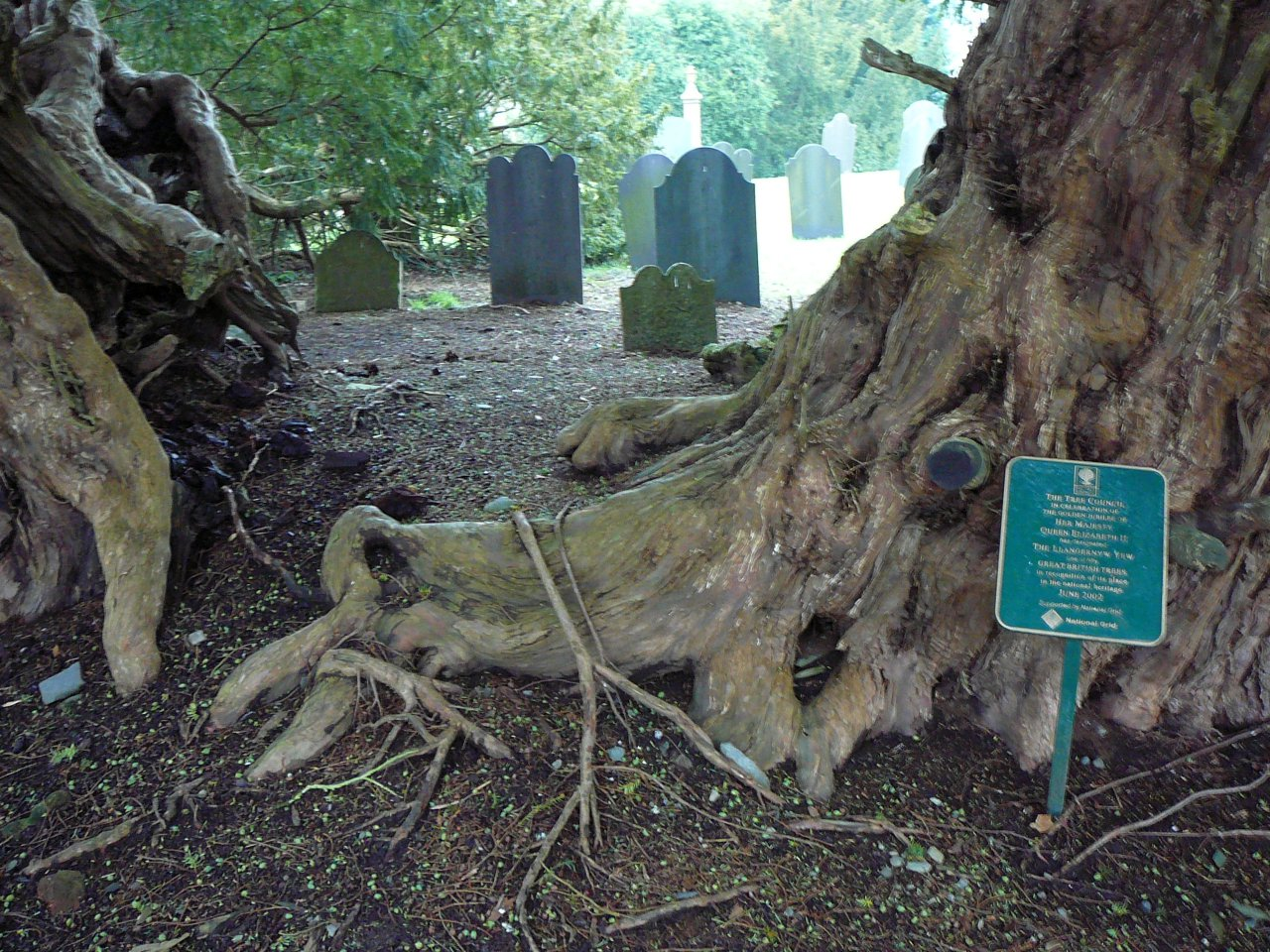
Split trunk section where the church oil tank was formerly located

This yew tree lives in the churchyard of St. Digain's Church in Llangernyw village. Although it is very hard to determine the age of yew trees, the churchyard gate holds a certificate from the Yew Tree Campaign in 2002, signed by David Bellamy, which states that "according to all the data we have to hand" the tree is dated to between 4,000 and 5,000 years old. David Bellamy used the same methods as he did when establishing the age of the Tisbury Yew in Wiltshire, including radiocarbon dating.

A carved stone board by the tree itself confirms that estimate and also puts the age of the tree at 4,000–5,000 years, which would make the Llangernyw Yew one of the oldest non-cloning trees in the world, potentially rivalling Methuselah in California and even the Fortingall Yew in Scotland. It has, however, been claimed that the Defynnog yew from the Brecon Beacons surpasses the Llangernyw Yew in age, although an investigation into its age does not support that claim. There is an alternative theory that presumes the tree is only as old as the use of the location by Christians, which would make it around 1,500 years old.

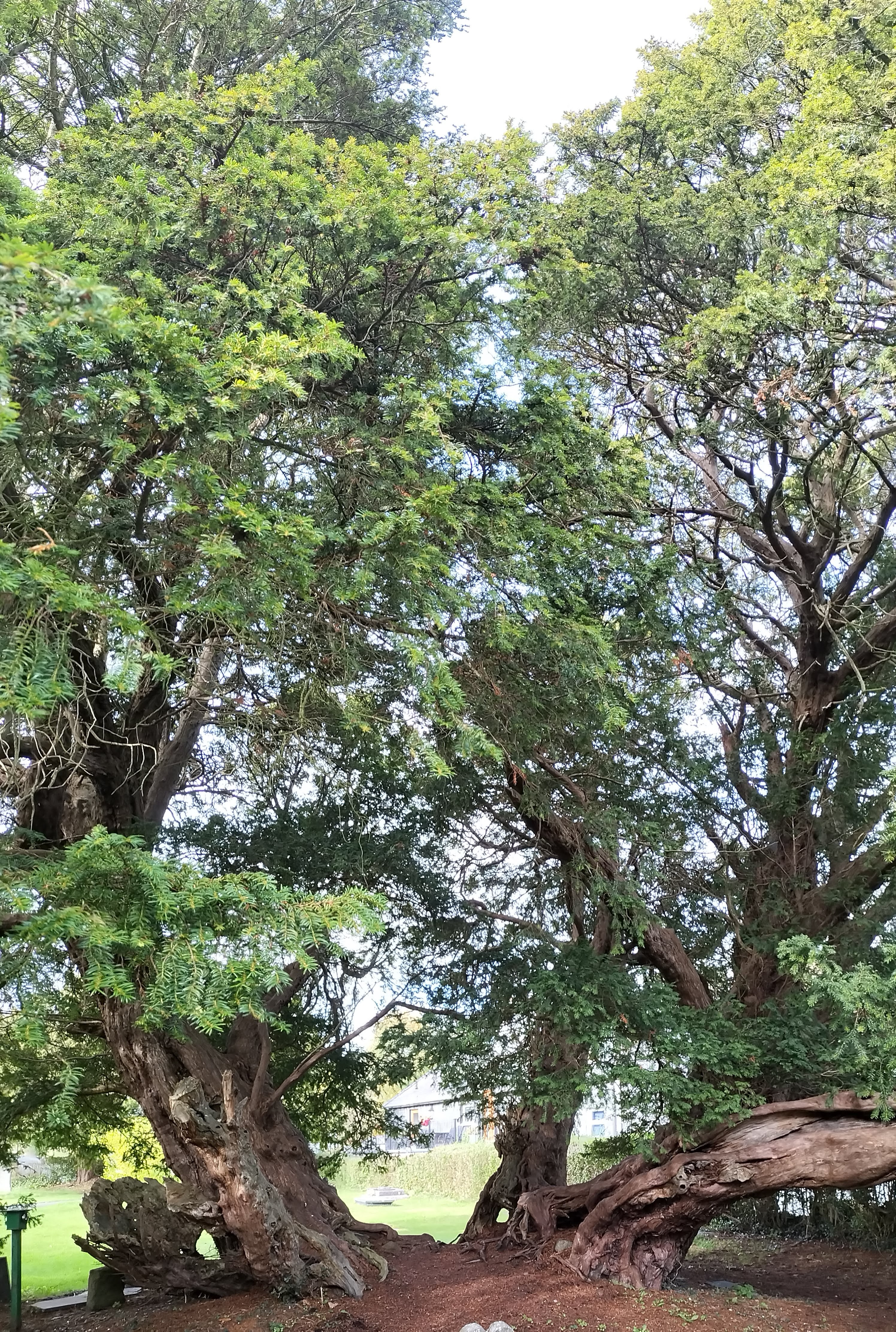
Llangernyw Yew

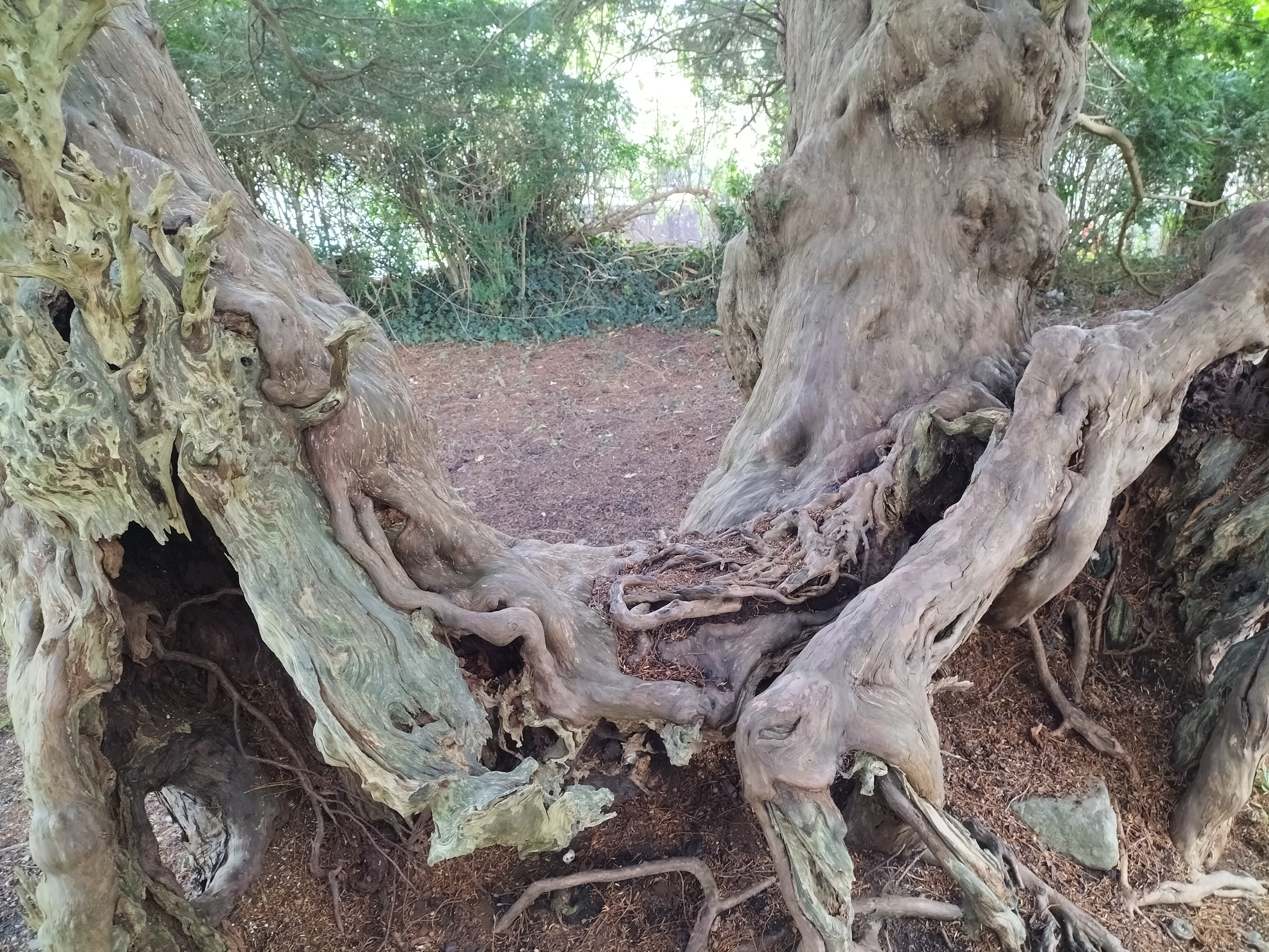
Llangernyw Yew close-up

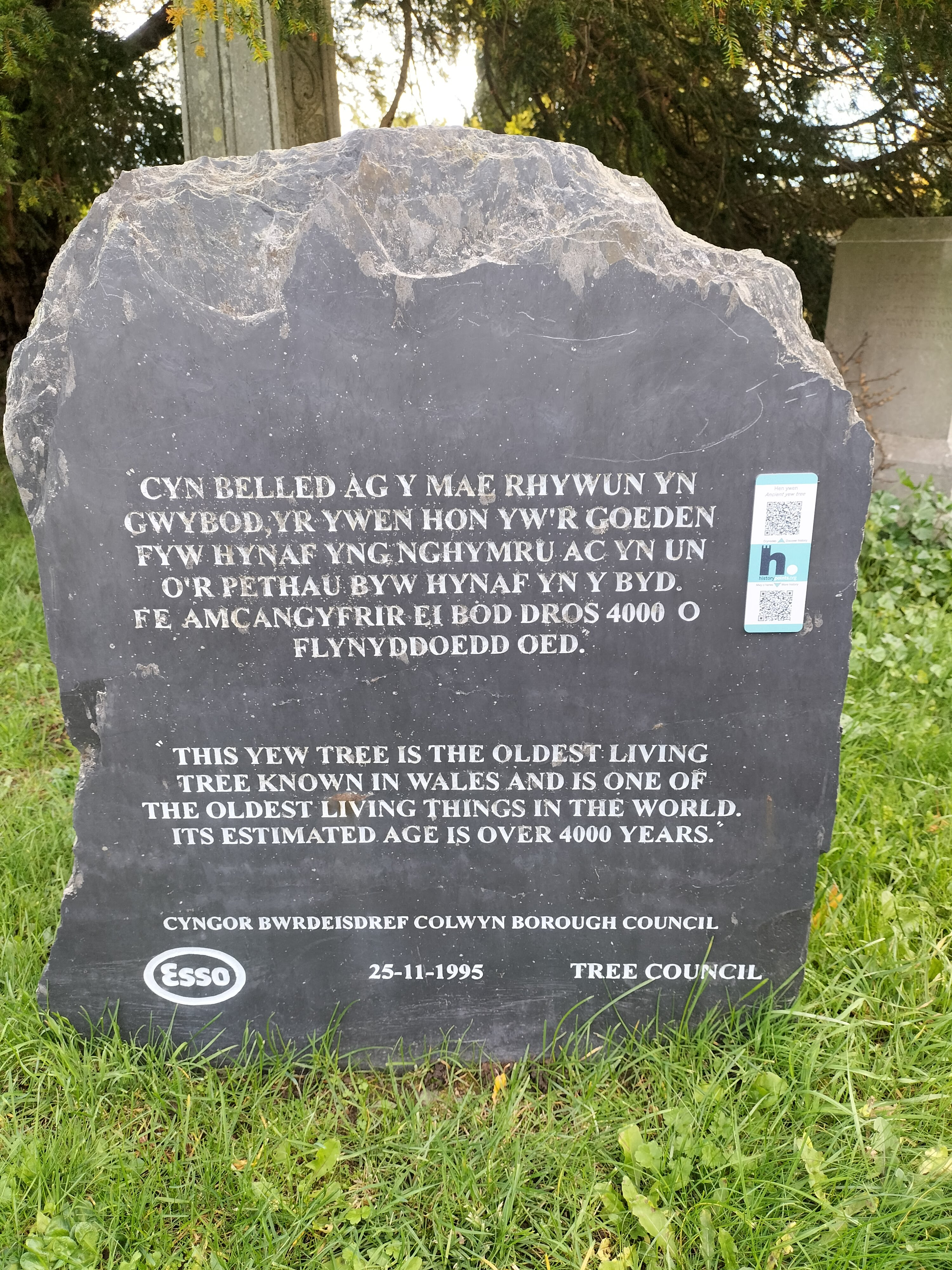
Memorial board establishing the yew's immense, possibly record-breaking, age for a non-cloning tree

In the mid-1990s, the church oil tank stood in the space between the two trunk fragments; however, this was moved when it was realised that the tree was ancient. When this tank was built a lot of the dead wood was removed from the site, which makes dating the age of the tree more difficult for dendrochronologists. In June 2002, the Tree Council, in celebration of the Golden Jubilee of Queen Elizabeth II, designated the Llangernyw Yew tree one of the Fifty Great British trees in recognition of its place in national heritage.

== Legend of the Angelystor ==
According to local tradition, the church of Llangernyw is inhabited by an ancient spirit known as Angelystor (the "Recording Angel" or "Evangelist" in Welsh). This tradition holds that every year at Halloween a booming voice foretells the names of parishioners who will die the following year. Folklore tells of a disbelieving local man, Siôn Ap Rhobert, who challenged the existence of the spirit one Halloween night only to hear his own name called out, followed by his death within the year.

== See also ==
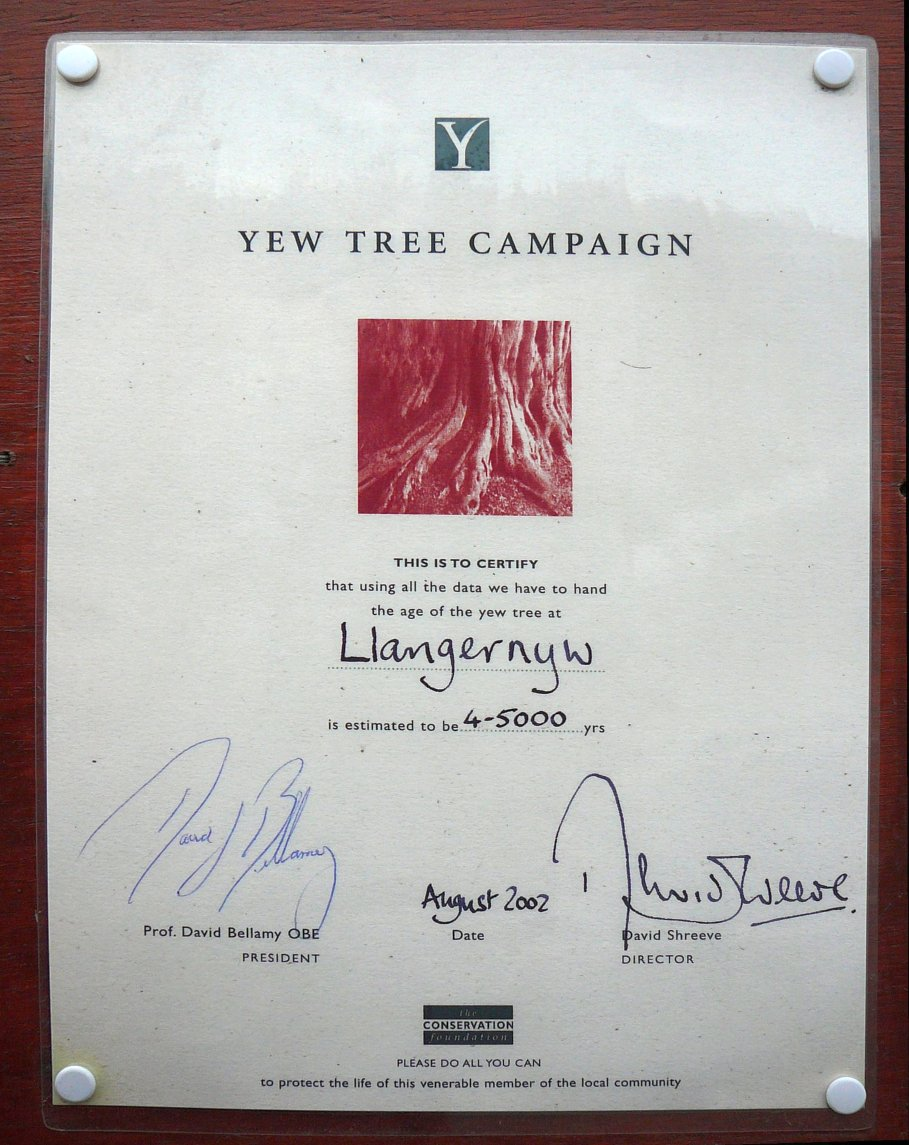
Certificate on the church gate

- List of oldest trees
- List of Great British Trees
- List of individual trees
- Ankerwycke Yew
- Fortingall Yew
- Defynnog Yew
- Craigends Yew
