= St Cynog's Church, Defynnog =

Church in Powys, Wales

Coordinates: 51.9395°N 3.5647°W

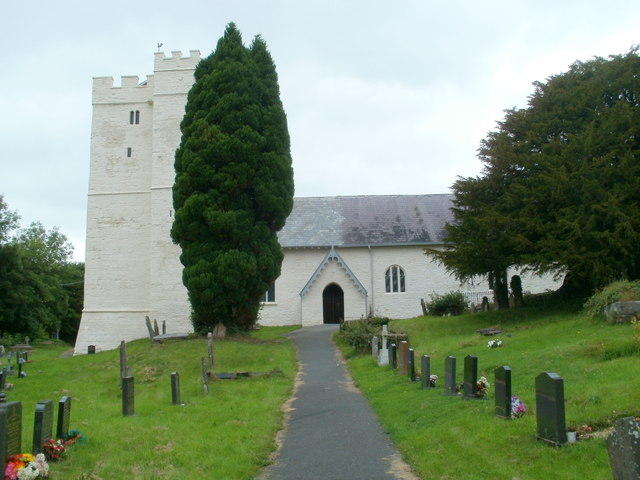
- The church and the Defynnog Yew

- Location in Powys
- OS grid reference: SO 925 279
- Location: Defynnog, Powys
- Country: Wales
- Denomination: Church in Wales

History
- Status: active
- Dedication: Saint Cynog

Architecture
- Heritage designation: Grade I
- Designated: 17 January 1963
- Architectural type: Church
- Groundbreaking: 15th century

Administration
- Diocese: Swansea and Brecon
- Archdeaconry: Brecon
- Deanery: Greater Brecon
- Parish: Brecon and Epynt Ministry Area

St Cynog's Church is an active parish church in the village of Defynnog, Powys, Wales. The dedication is to Saint Cynog, one of the 24 children of Brychan, a legendary 5th-century king of Brycheiniog. Dating from the 15th century, with earlier elements, the church was restored in the late 19th century. The churchyard is notable for its collection of ancient yew trees, the Defynnog Yew which is among the oldest in Britain. St Cynog's is designated by Cadw as a Grade I listed building.

== History ==
The Church of St Cynog stands in a large churchyard, in the centre of the village of Defynnog, just to the south of Sennybridge. The present church dates from the 15th century. Records show at least one earlier church, dating from the 13th century, and the Royal Commission on the Ancient and Historical Monuments of Wales (RCAHMW) records built evidence in the form of carved stones dating back to the 5th or 6th centuries. The Clwyd-Powys Archaeological Trust survey undertaken in 1995 expressed doubt that the "Celtic" window in the church is actually a pre-Norman feature. Robert Scourfield and Richard Haslam, in their Powys volume in the Buildings of Wales series, date the tower to c.1500. The Church in Wales Historic Record notes the building's restoration in the late 19th century. Cadw records the cost of the reconstruction at £1,793.

The church remains an active parish church in the Diocese of Swansea and Brecon and occasional services are held.

=== Defynnog Yews ===
The churchyard contains four ancient yew trees, one of which has been dated at roughly 3,000 years old, making them among the oldest in Britain. Claims have been made for even greater antiquity, but these are contested.

== Architecture and description ==
St Cynog's is built of rubble stone. (Note: Scourfield and Haslam, writing in 2013, noted that a coating of cream ochre had been applied to the exterior of the church, "to great effect".) It consists of a nave and chancel, a north chapel, a west tower, and south porch. The RCAHMW notes that the Perpendicular style is due in part to later remoulding rather than the original construction. The church contains two carved stones of very early origin; in the porch is a Roman gravestone, incised with the wording, "Rugniatio Livendoni" and the font has an inscription, "Siwurd + Gwlmer" in Runic script in the Lombardic language.

St Cynog's is as a Grade I listed building. The former vicarage is listed at Grade II.

== Sources ==
- Hindson, Toby (2014). "Addressing the claim that the Defynnog yews in Powys may be 5,000 years old" (PDF). Ancient Yew Group.
- Scourfield, Robert; Haslam, Richard (2013). Powys: Montgomeryshire, Radnorshire and Breconshire. The Buildings of Wales. New Haven, US and London: Yale University Press. ISBN 978-0-300-18508-9. OCLC 863678002.
