= Senni =

Senni may refer to:

- Lorenzo Senni (born 1983), Italian musician and visual artist
- Manuel Senni (born 1992), Italian cyclist
- Afon Senni, a river in Wales
