= Dywel fab Erbin =

Minor character and warrior of Welsh tradition

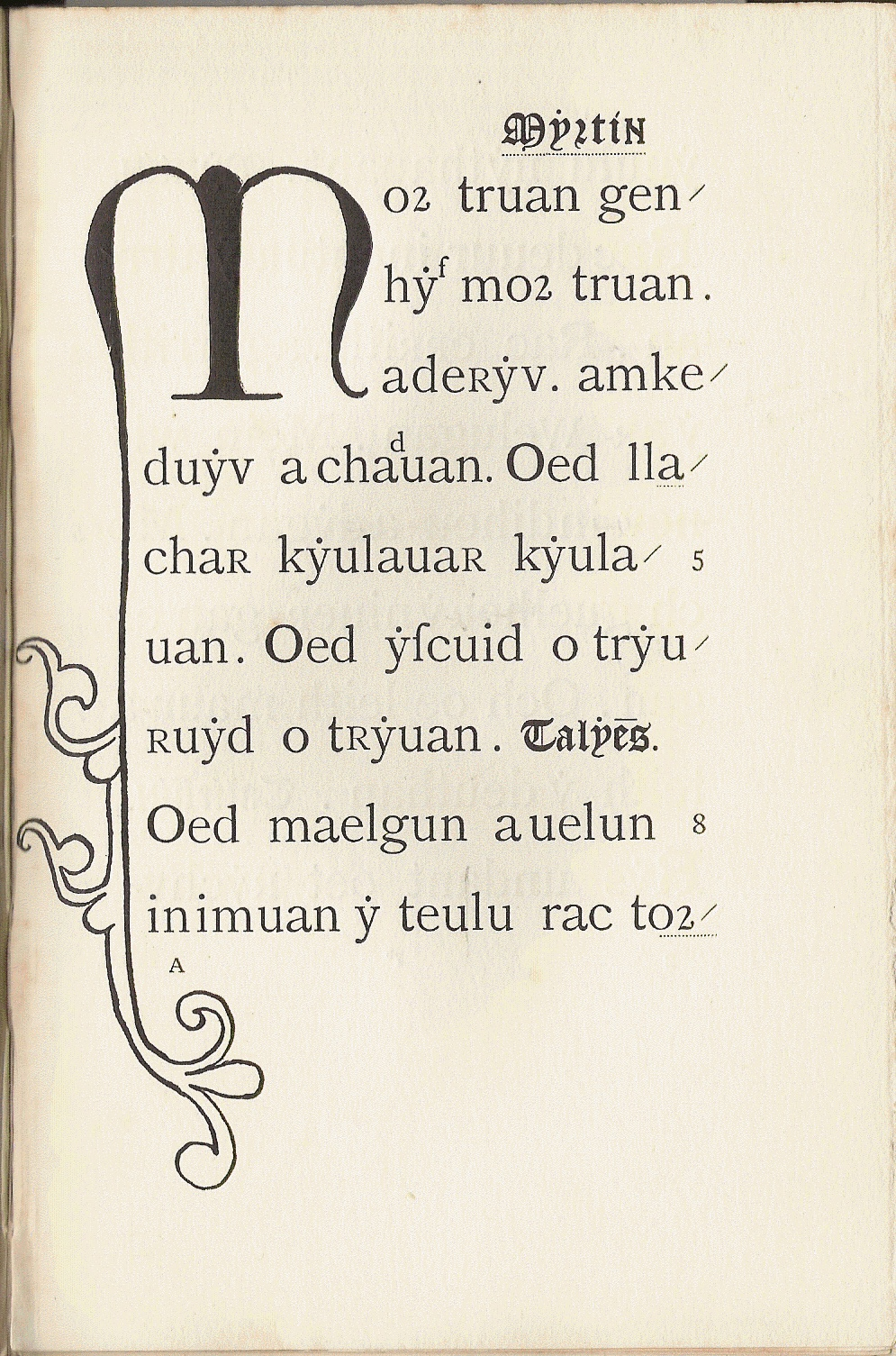
Page 1 from J. G. Evans' edition (1907) of the Black Book of Carmarthen, being the 'Ymddiddan' (dialogue) between Myrddin (Merlin) and Taliesin.

Dywel fab Erbin is a minor character and warrior of Welsh tradition, the son of Erbin and the brother of Geraint and Ermid. Alongside his brothers, he is named in the early Arthurian tale Culhwch ac Olwen as a knight of Arthur's court at Celliwig.

His death in battle is recorded in the Black Book of Carmarthen poem The Dialogue of Myrddin and Taliesin, in which it is written:

Again and again, in great throngs they came,
There came Bran and Melgan to meet me.
At the last, they slew Dyel,
The son of Erbin, with all his men.

In the Stanzas of the Graves, Dywel's final resting place is given as "Caewaw" or "Caeo", a commot in south-west Wales. The englyn extolls Dywel's bravery on the battlefield.

The Grave of Dywel, the son of Erbin, is in the plain of Caewaw
He would not be a vassal to a king;
Blameless, he would not shrink from battle.

== Sources ==
- A. O. Jarman (gol.), Llyfr Du Caerfyrddin (Cardiff, 1982)
- eto (gol.), Ymddiddan Myrddin a Thaliesin (Cardiff, 1951)
