= John Jones (harpist) =

Welsh harpist

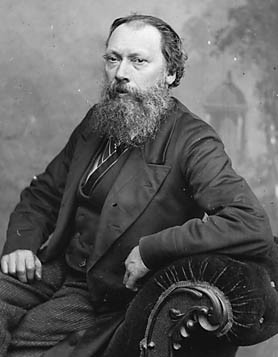
- Jones in 1875
- Born: 1825; Dolgellau, Wales
- Died: 3 November 1887 (aged 61–62); Manchester, England
- Burial place: Ardwick Cemetery
- Occupations: Harpist; Poet; Writer; Shoemaker

John Jones (1825 – 3 November 1887) colloquially known under his poetic name of Idris Fychan was a Welsh harpist, shoemaker, poet and writer, considered one of the most popular local musical figures of his time. He was a close friend of fellow poet John Ceiriog Hughes.

== Biography ==
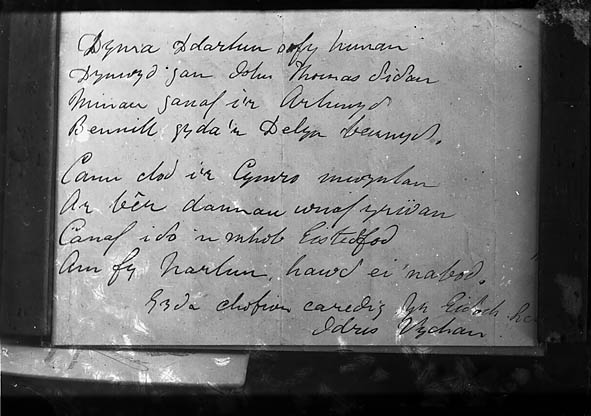
An 1885 poem manuscript of Jones

Jones was born in Dolgellau, Gwynedd in 1825 and came from the Ellis Roberts (Eos Meirion) family. He inherited his musical skills from his mother who was also a good singer. He earned his living as a shoemaker but soon his talents as a harpist came to the fore and he became known as Idris Fychan. He moved to work in London and then to Manchester in 1857.

At the 1850 edition of the Rhuddlan Eisteddfod, Jones won a prize for his award-winning essay on 'Singing with the Harp', and at the Caerleon Eisteddfod from 1866, he was awarded the prize for an essay on 'The History and Antiquity of Singing with the Harp'. He was also an Eisteddfod poet and one of John Ceiriog Hughes's closest friends. While in Manchester, he also taught fellow musician Robert Griffith to play the harp and sing verses.

He bought at a Manchester secondhand store in 1879 (fifty years after the death of its owner) a harp which had belonged to Edward Jones (Bardd y Brenin), which had on it a brass plate with the following inscription: 'Edward Jones Henblas Llandderfel 1765.'

He died on 3 November 1887 and was buried in Ardwick Cemetery, in Manchester.
