= Moses Williams (antiquarian) =

Welsh antiquarian scholar (1685–1742)

Moses Williams (2 March 1685 – 2 March 1742: burial date) was a Welsh antiquarian, scholar and cleric. He oversaw new editions of the Bible and the Book of Common Prayer in Welsh.

== Life ==
Williams was born the son of Samuel Williams, Vicar of Llandyfriog and Rector of Llangynllo, Cardiganshire, and his wife, Margaret, daughter of Jenkin Powell Prytherch, in Y Glaslyn, near Llandysul, Ceredigion, in south-west Wales. He was ordained deacon in 1708 and priest in 1713. He was married to Margaret Davies of Cwmwysg, Defynnog.

Williams later served as Curate of Chiddingstone, Kent (1708–1713), Vicar of Llanwenog, Cardiganshire (1715–1742), Vicar of Defynnog (Devynock), Brecknockshire, where his name is carved on one of the attic beams of the rectory (1716–1732), Rector of Chilton Trinity, Somerset, and finally Vicar of St Mary's, Bridgwater, Somerset (1732–1742).

Williams was elected a Fellow of the Royal Society in 1719. He died in Bridgwater.

== Works ==
Williams supervised new editions of the Bible and the Anglican Book of Common Prayer in Welsh. His library, containing many Welsh books and manuscripts, came into the possession of William Jones and then into the library of George Parker, 2nd Earl of Macclesfield at Shirburn Castle.

Williams worked closely with Edward Lhuyd on the Archaeologia Britannica (1707) and with William Wotton on the Leges Wallicae, a parallel text edition of the laws of Hywel Dda, published in 1730.
