= Defynnog =

Village in Wales

Coordinates: 51.93947°N 3.56468°W

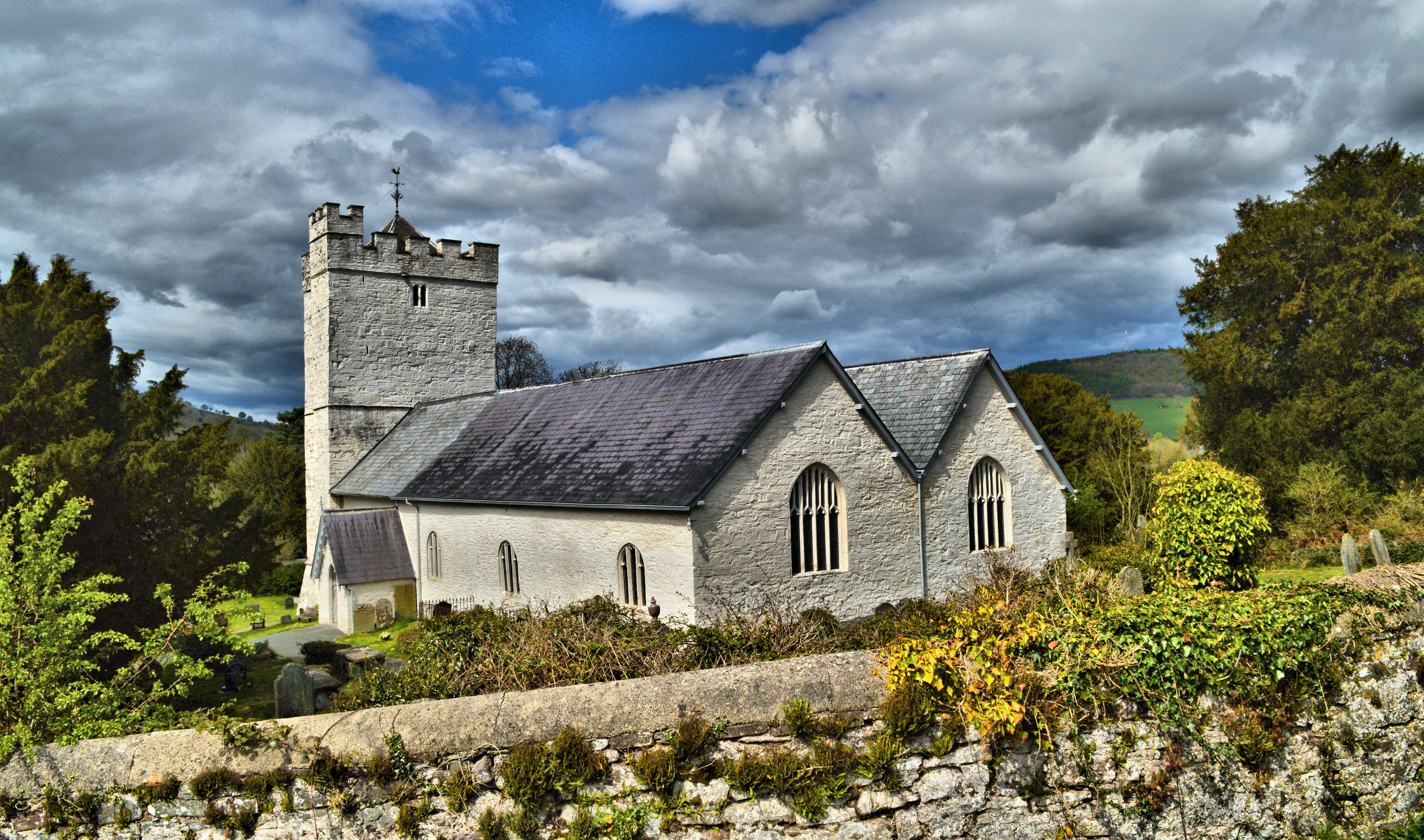
St Cynog's Church

Defynnog, (sometimes found as Devynock in some historical documents), is a small village in the community of Maescar in the historic county of Brecknockshire, Wales, now lying within the unitary authority area of Powys. It lies immediately south of Sennybridge and about ten miles west of Brecon within the Brecon Beacons National Park.

== The village ==
An important place in the past, Defynnog lost much of its importance as Sennybridge became more developed. The village (which has also been referred to historically as 'Devynnock') is located in the Brecon Beacons National Park one mile south of Sennybridge, beside the Afon Senni just south of its confluence with the River Usk and where the A4215 road meets the A4065. The Welsh name signifies the 'territory belonging to Dyfwn'.

== History ==
To the southwest of the village is "Y Gaer", a small oval hillfort with a sub-rectangular annex standing on a ridge. The ramparts and ditches are covered with bracken.

The Church of St Cynog contains an ancient stone with ogham inscriptions and is a grade I listed building. In 1836 a chapel in the parish of Defynnog was dedicated to Saint Callwen.

The churchyard contains several yew trees, of which the largest, the Defynnog Yew has a girth large enough for it to be 1300–3000 years old. An adjacent yew was reported in 2014 to be genetically identical to the largest, leading to conjecture in the popular press that the two trees were remnants of a single 5000-year-old tree; but this conjecture has been disputed on the grounds that layering is a more plausible origin for the adjacent tree. The crown of the largest tree is 60 ft in diameter.

The rectory within the church grounds was once the property of Moses Williams FRS and his inscription is to found on the beams of one of the attics. The property immediately south of the lychgate (Ty Defynnog, Defynnog House) may have been made up of two former cottages. Its cellar contains a stone slab of uncertain purpose. It is a Grade II listed building.

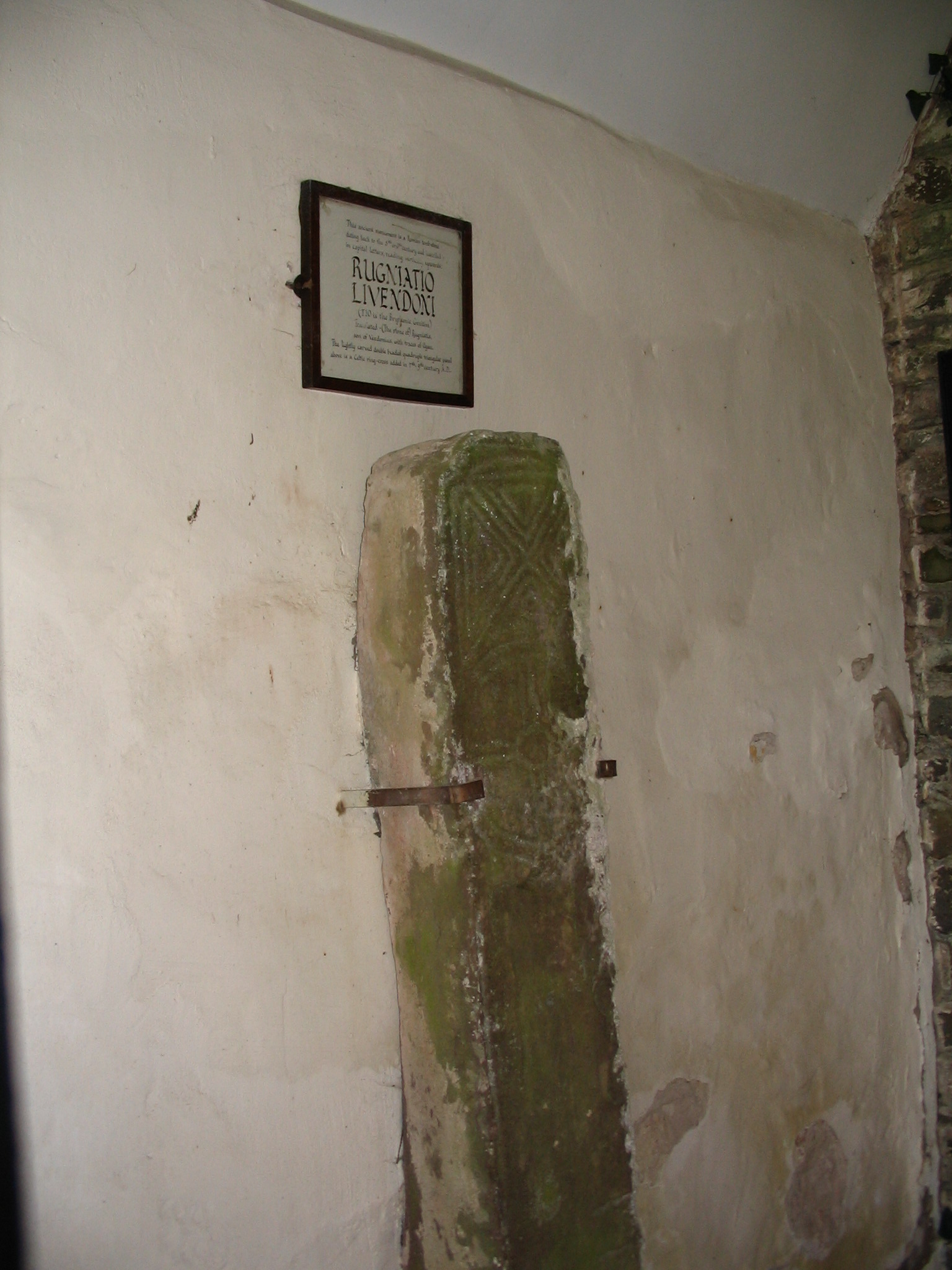
Ogham inscribed stone, Defynnog, Breconshire

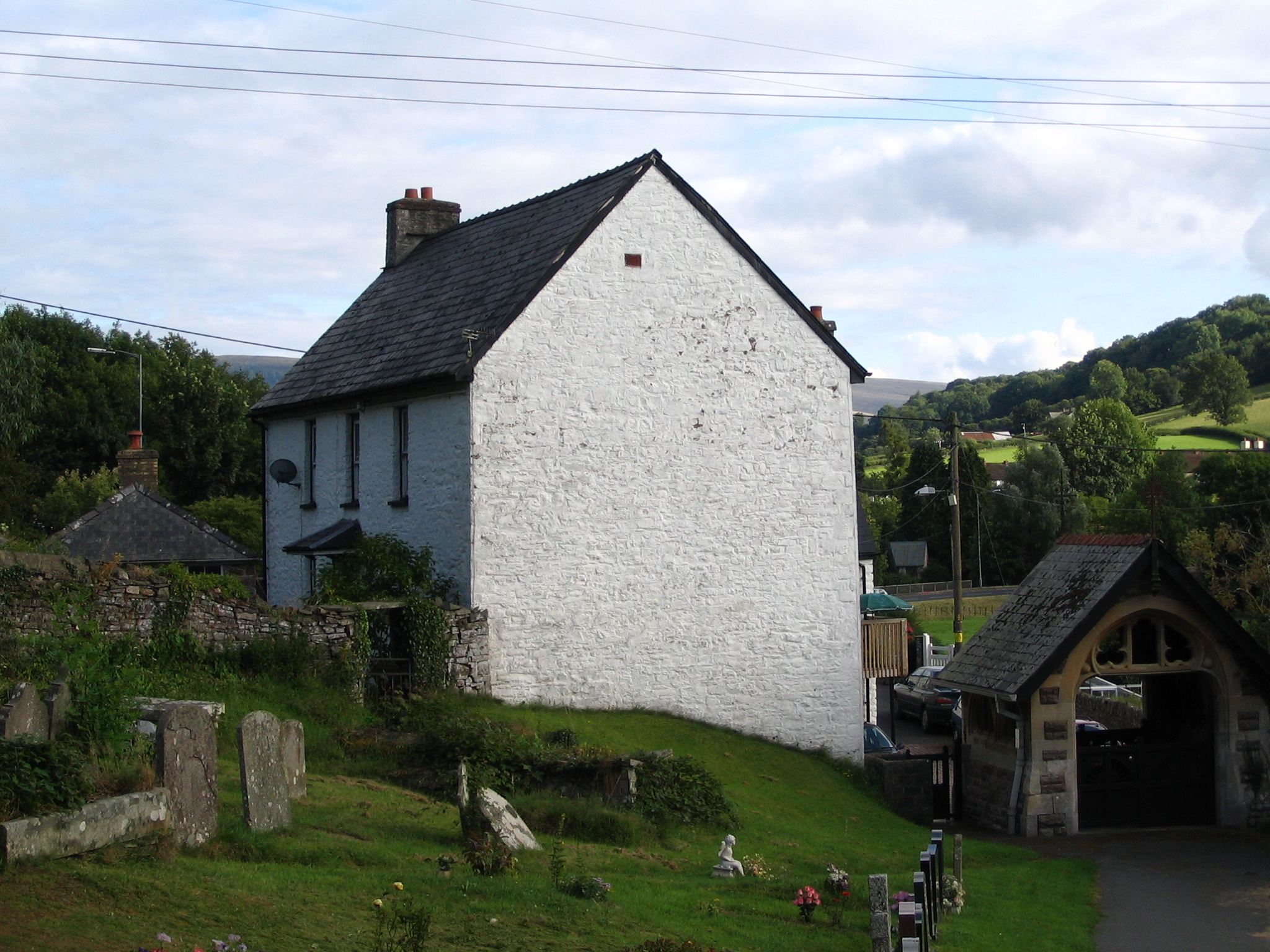
Defynnog House, Breconshire

The Sir John Davy School is now a cafe and antiques centre. The Sir John Davy Alms houses are sited close to a former police station and court, later a brass rubbing centre and now a bed and breakfast, complete with police cells.

The Tanners Arms has a long and colourful history. The main building ( now the bar and restaurant ) dates to the early 1800s and was originally three separate cottages, all being homes for the workers at the nearby Tannery. Thomas Jenkins, father of David Jenkins, a defender of Rorke's Drift, was landlord of the Tanners Arms in 1871.

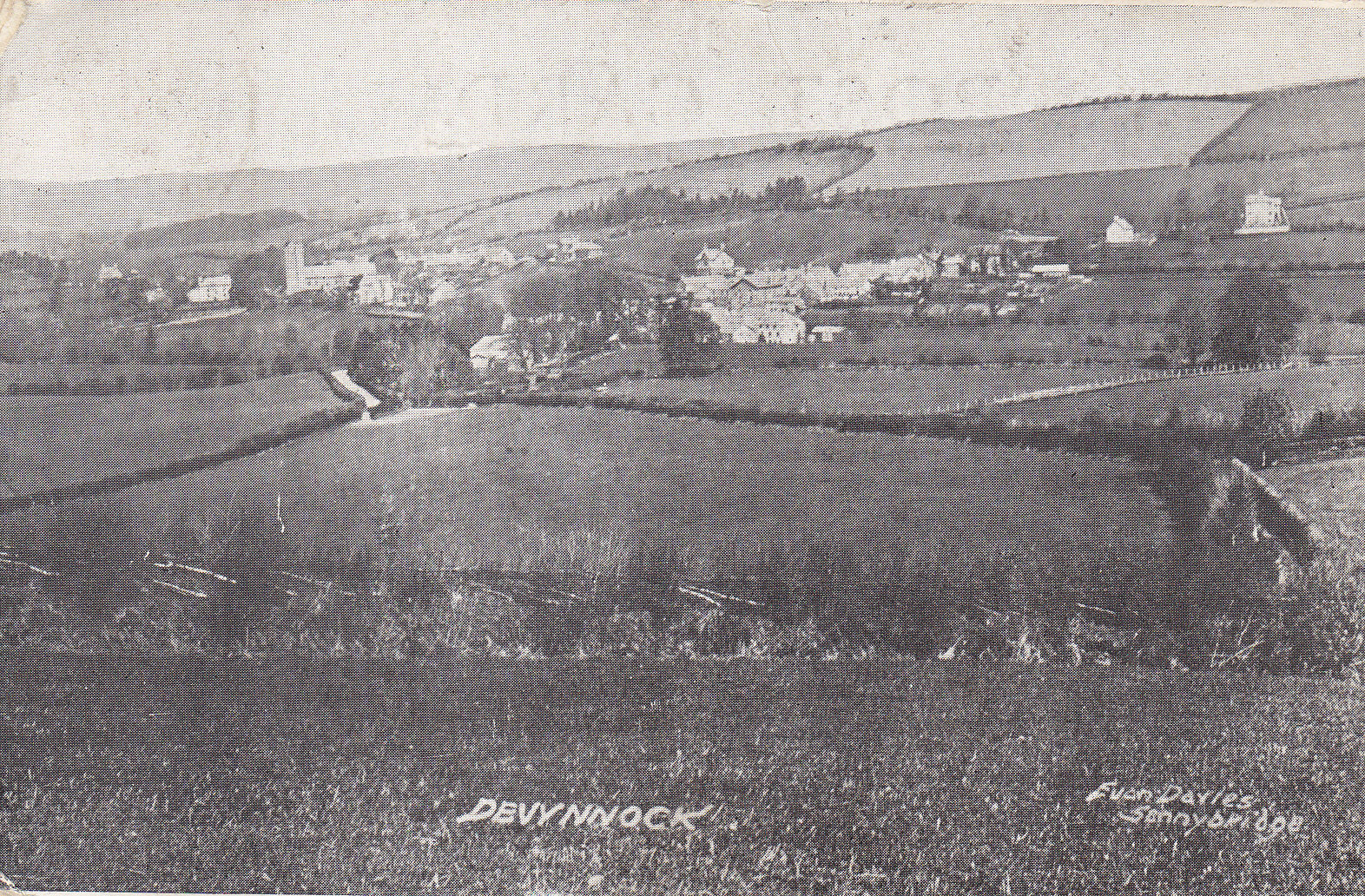
Defynnog, Breconshire, 1906

== Notable people ==
- Moses Davies (1799–1866), a Welsh musician and composer.
- Isabella Gifford (1825–1891), a Welsh-born botanist, primarily an algologist, studying algae.
- Gwenllian Morgan (1852–1939), an antiquary and the first woman in Wales to hold the office of Mayor.
- William Havard MC (1889–1956), a Welsh clergyman and rugby union international player.

== See also ==
- List of oldest trees
- Fortingall Yew
