= Defynnog Yew =

One of the world's oldest known European Yews

Coordinates: 51°56′23″N 03°33′53″W

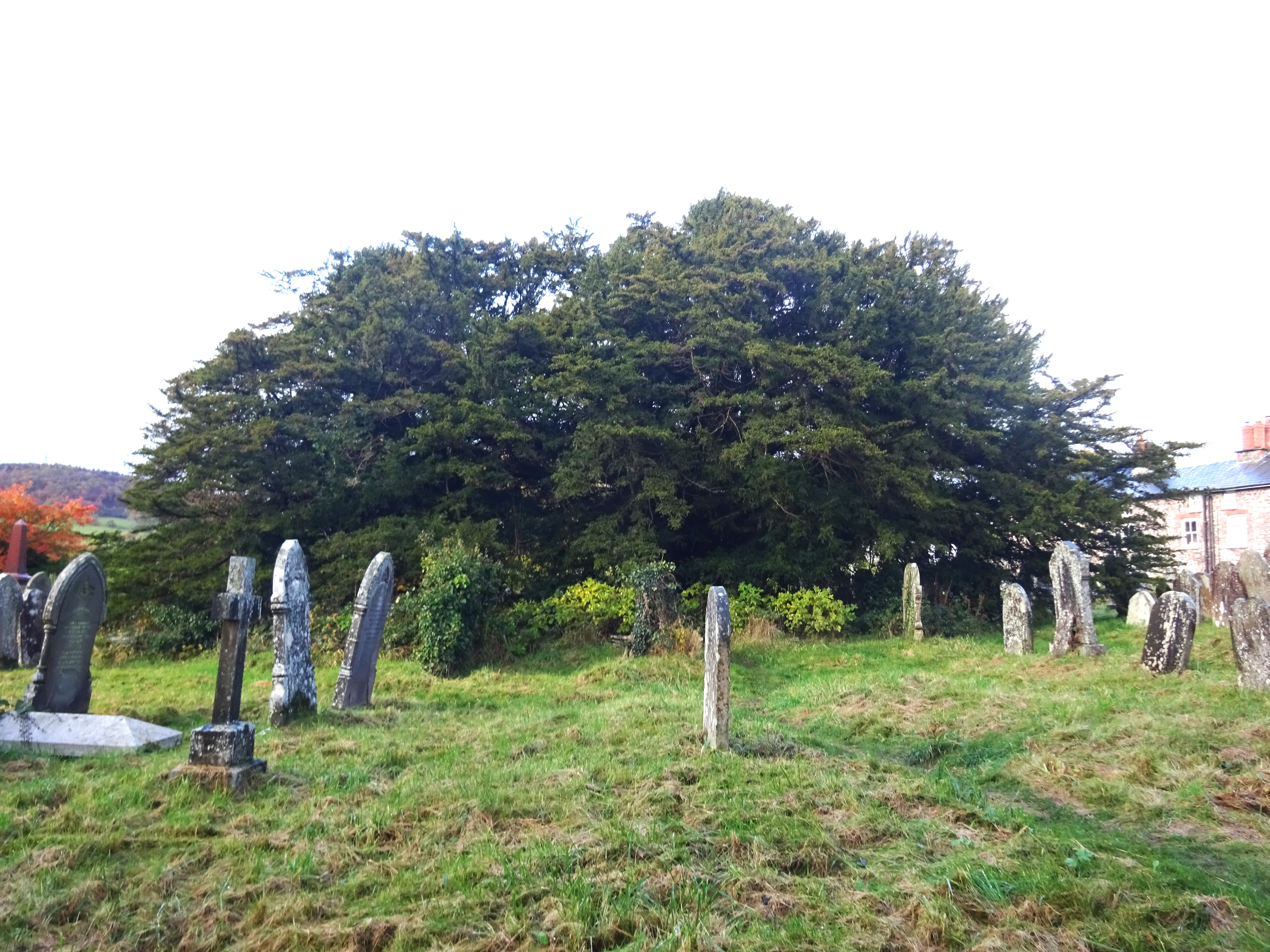
The Defynnog Yews

The Defynnog Yew (Welsh: Ywen Defynnog) (SN9253027960) is one of a group of ancient yews (Taxus baccata) in the churchyard of St Cynog's Church, which serves the parish and the village of Defynnog, Powys, Wales. Defynnog is located close to Sennybridge, about ten miles west of Brecon, within the Brecon Beacons National Park (Bannau Brycheiniog).

== The Defynnog Yews ==
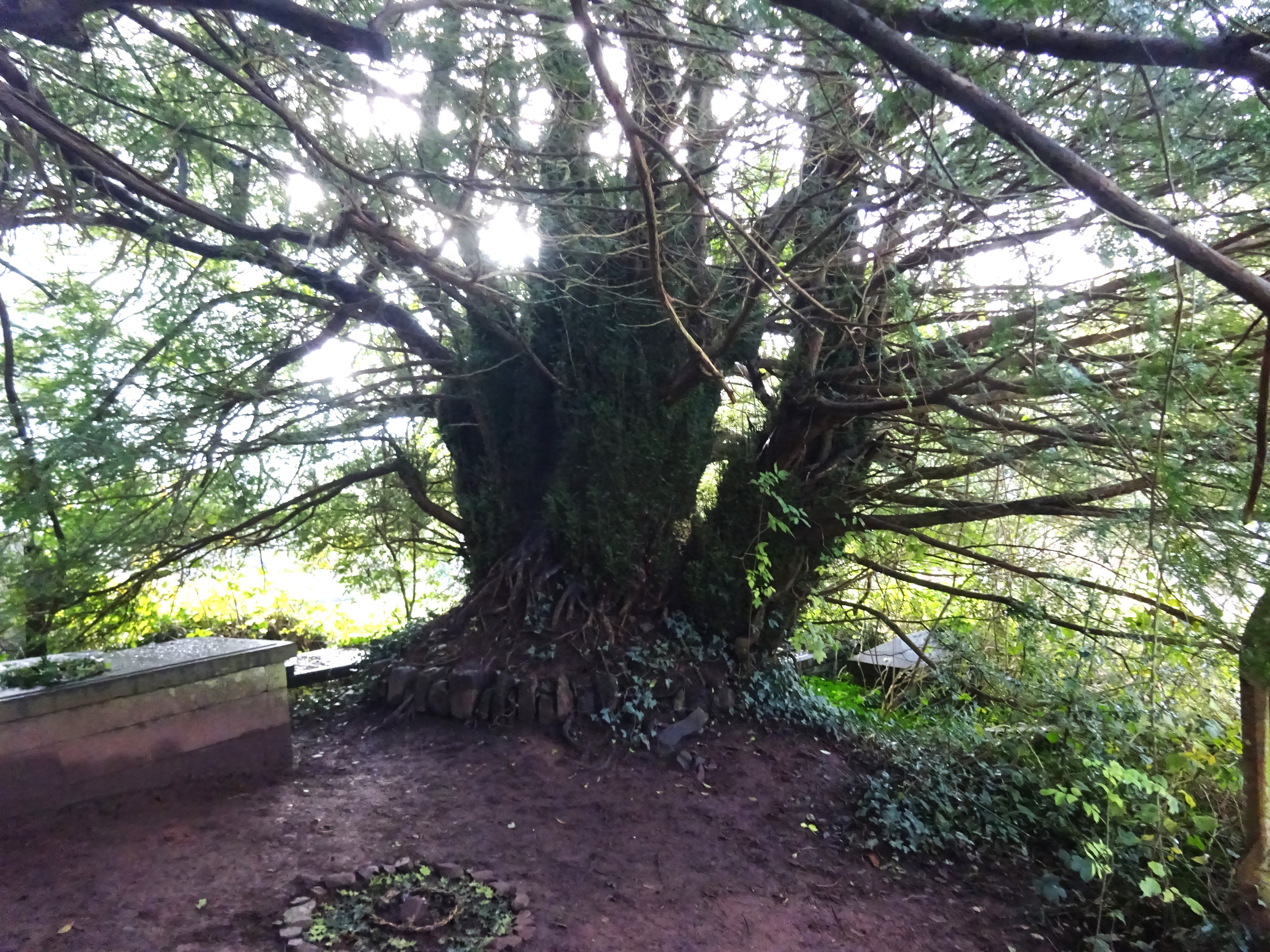
The trunk and branches of the smaller of the genetically identical yew trees at Defynnog

This group of four ancient yews lies within the churchyard, the oldest aged by one assessment at 3,018 years. It grows from a mound measuring 8 m (26 ft) across and 1 m (3 ft 3 in) high, and forms nine distinct stems that grow from a base which has an overall circumference of 11 m (36 ft). The second yew growing on the north side of the church lies 5 m (16 ft) to its west. Although shown to be genetically identical, such a distance makes it highly unlikely that they are fragments of what was once a single tree. The second yew has possibly layered from a pendulous branch (see video) of the larger one; yews quite often layer from branches which are able to touch the ground and then develop roots. An Iron Age date is suggested from the available dendrochronology and growth rate studies indicating that the yews are more probably around 2,500 years.

In 2005 a single male branch was found to be growing on the largest of the two female trees. Yew trees are usually only a single sex, that is dioecious, requiring two trees of different sex to interact to produce seed, however it is not uncommon for trees to be both sexes monoecious. A small area of the smaller tree has a growth of albino white leaves. Both trees have unusually extensive epicormic shoot growth coating the trunks in green leaves, a process that usually only occurs after physical damage to the bark or increased light levels.

As stated, the two trees lying to the north of the church are a genetically identical pair. This is not thought to be because of fragmentation with the section between rotting away; layering is a definite possibility, and a lightning strike causing the tree to split into two is a very remote possibility. Pendulous yews with long horizontal branches that eventually touch the ground and root are well documented, e.g. the Craigends Yew in Scotland. The two yews on the south side of the church are not genetically identical to those on the north side or to each other.

The trees have a number of epiphytes such as ferns, ivy, liverworts, lichens and mosses that are encouraged by the high humidity maintained by the leaf cover of this evergreen species.

== History ==
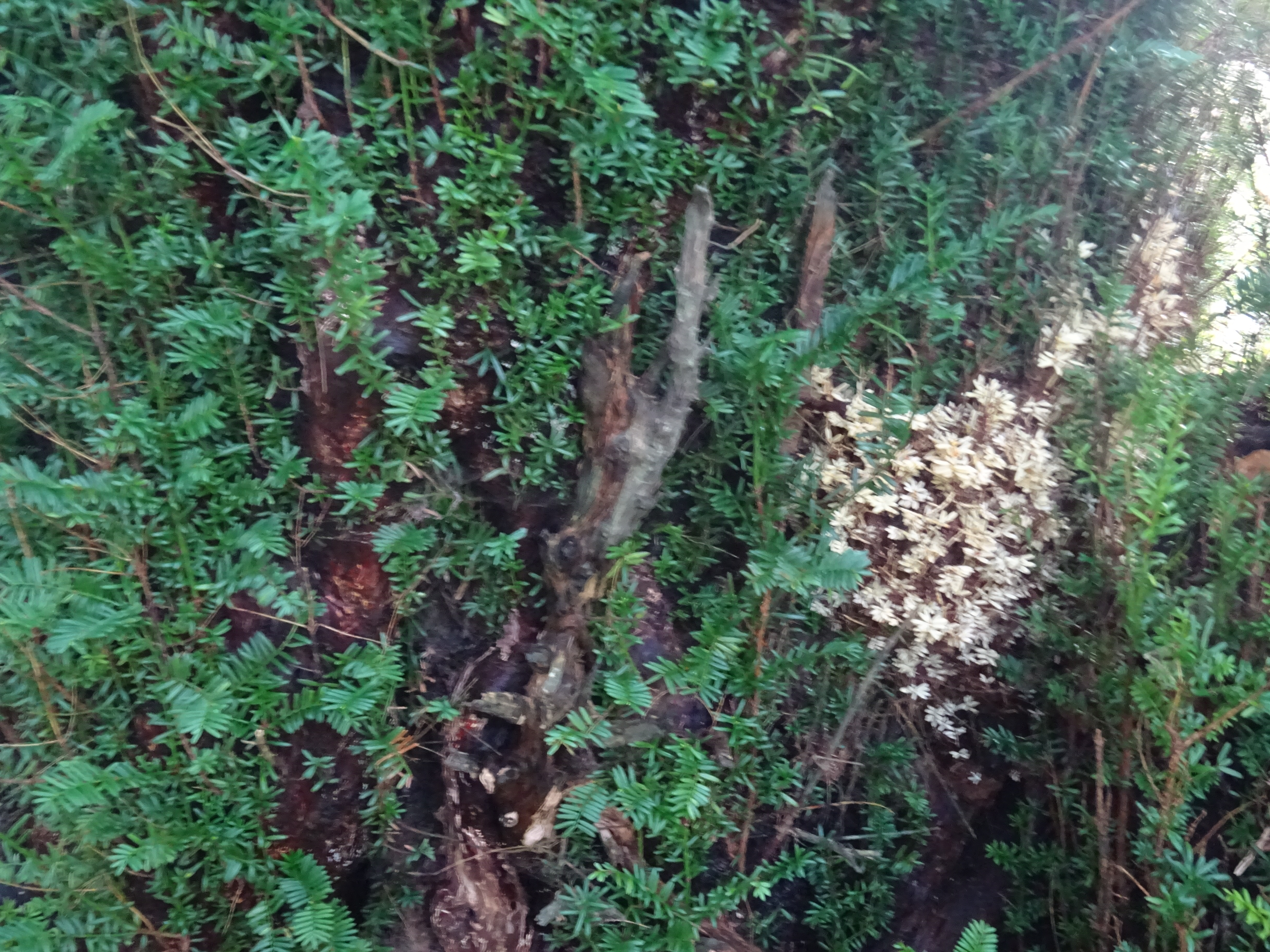
Epicormic albino leaf growth on the smaller Defynnog Yew

This yew tree or trees stands in the churchyard of St Cynog's Church. It is very hard to accurately determine the age of yew trees and a nearby café and gift shop holds a certificate of 2002 from the Yew Tree Campaign, signed by David Bellamy, which states that "according to all the data we have to hand" the tree is dated to approximately 5,000 years old". David Bellamy used the same methods as he did when establishing the age of the Tisbury Yew in Wiltshire, including radiocarbon dating.

The date on this certificate would make the Defynnog Yew potentially even older than Scotland's well-known Fortingall Yew. An investigation into its age does not support this view. It is considered more likely that the two yew trees are in the order of two to three thousand years old. Toby Hindson of the Ancient Yew Group, has challenged the 5,000 years and 'gives a projected age on the hard evidence currently held by the AYG of a minimum 1,300 years.'

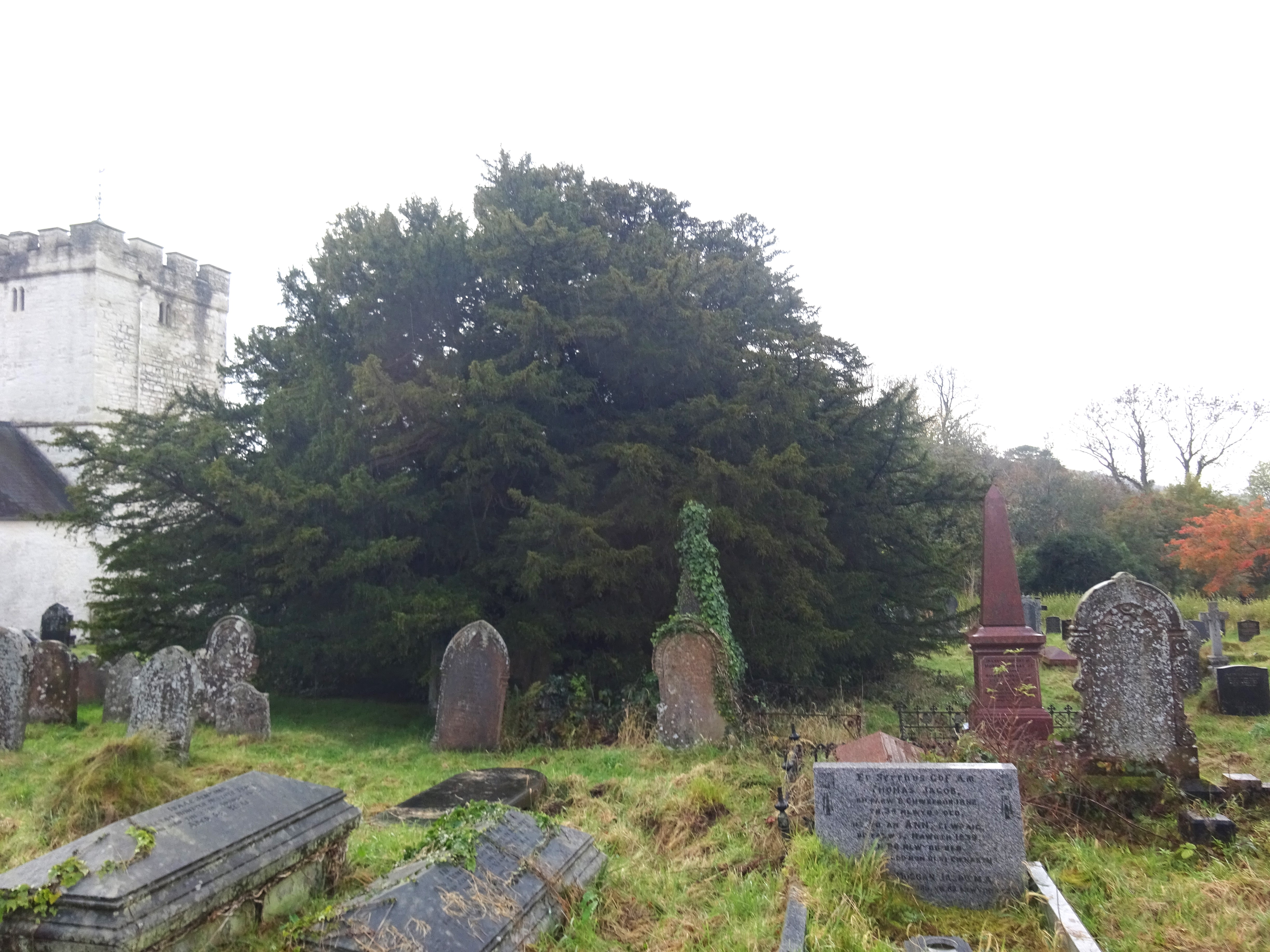
The Defynnog Yews and St Cynog's Church

Wales has 407 ancient or veteran yews that are more than 500 years old, while England has 978. France has 77 while Germany and Spain have just four each.

The local church, Grade I listed building dedicated to Saint Cynog, is mainly Norman in date, but the porch houses an ancient stone with Latin and ogham inscriptions. The Defynnog Yew predates the church and may have been planted to mark a meeting place or a place of burial as suggested by the above-mentioned burial stone. Cynog is thought to have been the son of Saint Brychan, a Welsh prince of the British Dark Ages.

Graves have been dug between the two yew trees and the trees have each been surrounded at some date by low decorative stone walling.

Yews are native to Wales and being extremely poisonous to stock and humans many have been dug up or planted within stock-proof enclosures such as churchyards where they commonly occur. The yew's wood is traditionally used to make longbows and the generic name 'Taxus' refers to the wood's connection to the sport of archery, namely toxophily.

== See also ==
- List of oldest trees
- List of Great British Trees
- List of individual trees
- Fortingall Yew

== References and further reading ==
- Bevan-Jones, R. (2004). The Ancient Yew: a History of Taxus baccata. Bollington: Windgather Press. ISBN 0-9545575-3-0.
- Fry, Janis. The Defynnog Yew. The Oldest Tree in Wales and Perhaps Europe
- Harte, J. (1996). How old is that old yew? At the Edge 4: 1–9. Available online.
- Kinmonth, F. (2006). "Ageing the yew – no core, no curve?" International Dendrology Society Yearbook 2005: 41–46.
