= Craigends Yew =

Remarkable tree in Renfrewshire, Scotland, UK

Coordinates: 55°51′45″N 4°31′35″W

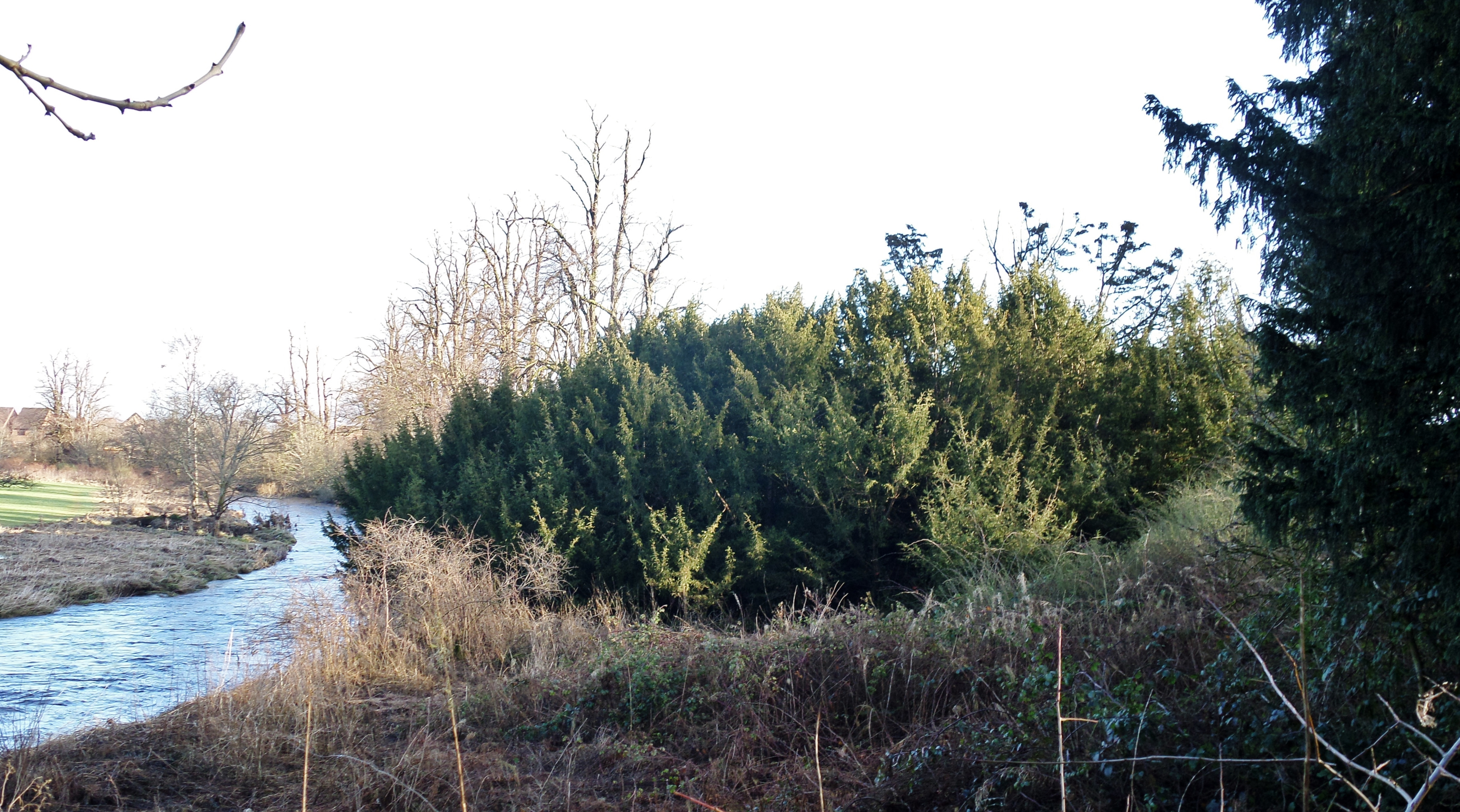
The Craigends Yew grove from the old ice house.

The Craigends Yew (NS4199566134) is an ancient European layering yew (Taxus baccata) growing next to the River Gryffe in what were the grounds of the Craigends Estate, Houston in Renfrewshire, Scotland. Estimates put its age at around 500 to 700 years old and it is one of the largest and oldest examples of a heritage layering yew in Scotland.

== The tree ==
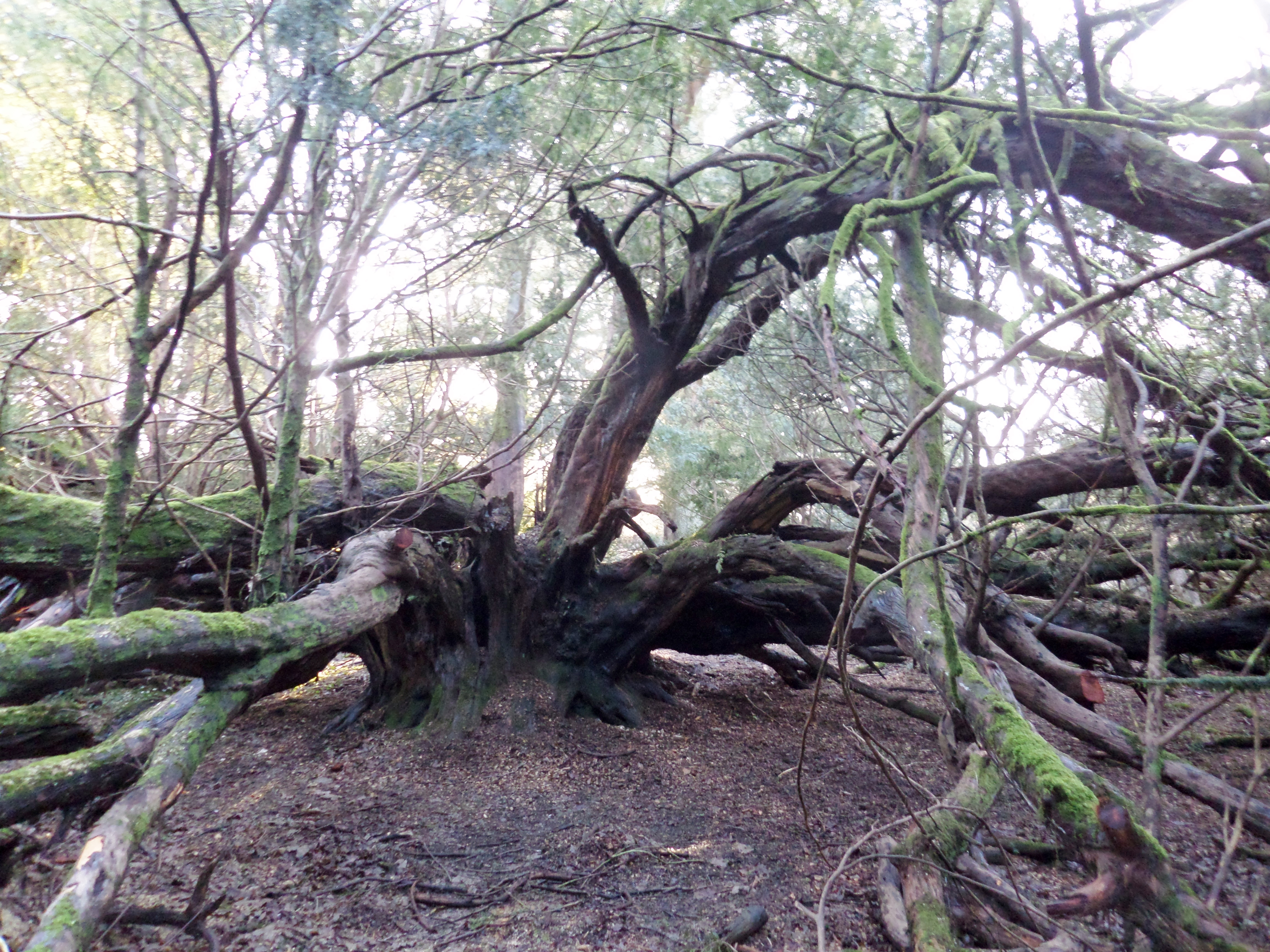
The tree trunk and layering branches.

The Ancient Tree Inventory records the Craigends Yew as tree number 31486. Layering yews differ from the standard growth form in that their branches grow in a pendulous fashion and upon contacting the soil level they root, a process called 'layering' and they may also send up new vertical stems. The central trunk will eventually die and the clones will continue to grow resulting in an increasing circumference and eventually a hollow centre. As layering is not a process involving sexual reproduction the new plants are clones of the parent tree and all of the new individuals formed have identical DNA with each other and the parent.

Estimates for the tree's age are for 600 to 700 years. The clonal grove has achieved a second row of branch layering and the crown has reached a circumference of 328ft or 100m. The parent tree has a girth of 27ft or 8.86m at 30cm.

The tree has a number of epiphytes such as ferns, ivy, liverworts, lichens and mosses that are encouraged by the high humidity maintained by the leaf cover of this evergreen species, supplemented by occasional flooding by the river. The condition of the tree is that it has a hollowing trunk, many water pockets in the branch angles, holes in the main trunk, decaying branches in the crown and rotting wood on the ground. A number of dormant buds on the horizontal branches are producing vertical growth of branches of varying sizes.

The tree lies just off a public footpath and it can also be viewed from the path through the park on the opposite side of the River Gryffe. It has been subjected to a degree of vandalism in the past, but in 2018 a conservation programme removed several trees from within the grove to reduce shading and cleared much of the surrounding scrub vegetation to improve access. The tree grove is in good health and has space to expand further on two sides as a housing estate fence confines it to the east and the River Gryffe does so to the north. It is possible to enter as a path has been cut through with only minor damage to the grove itself.

=== Growth forms of yew trees ===
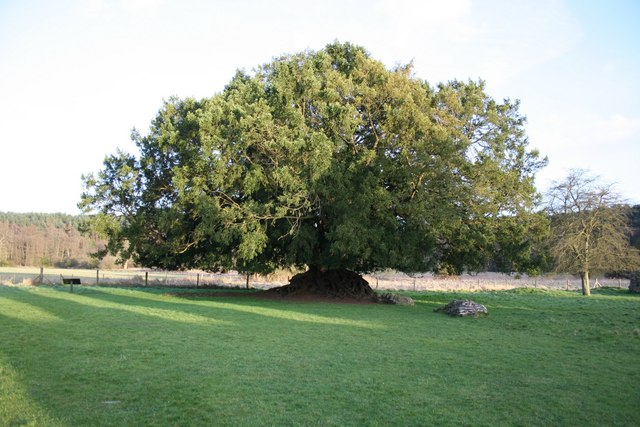
The common growth form of yew trees.

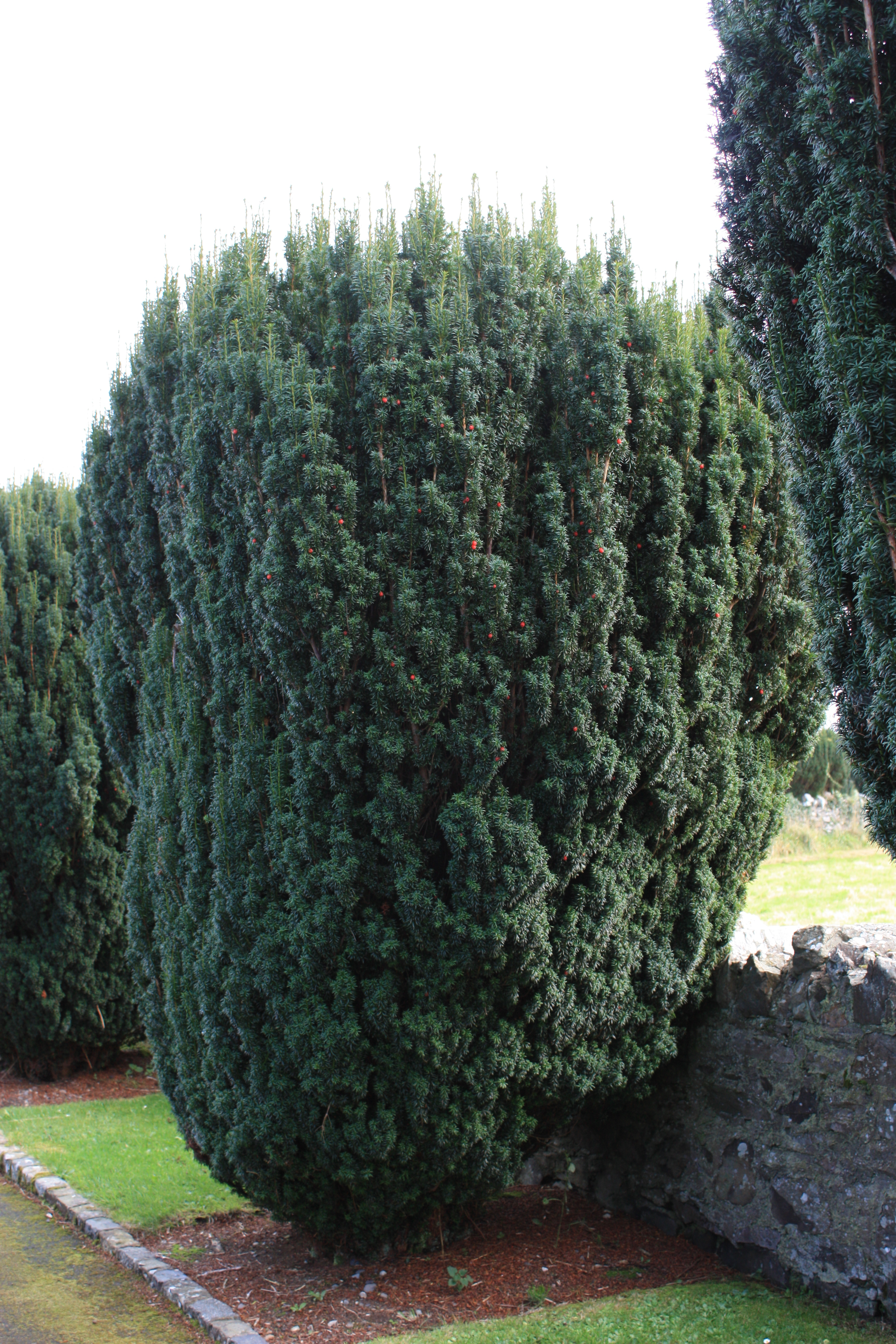
A fastigiate growth form with vertical branches as in Irish Yews.

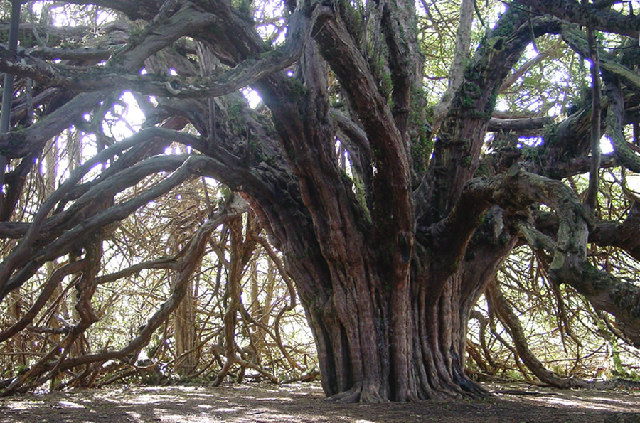
Another layering yew at Ormiston in East Lothian which dates from at least 1474.

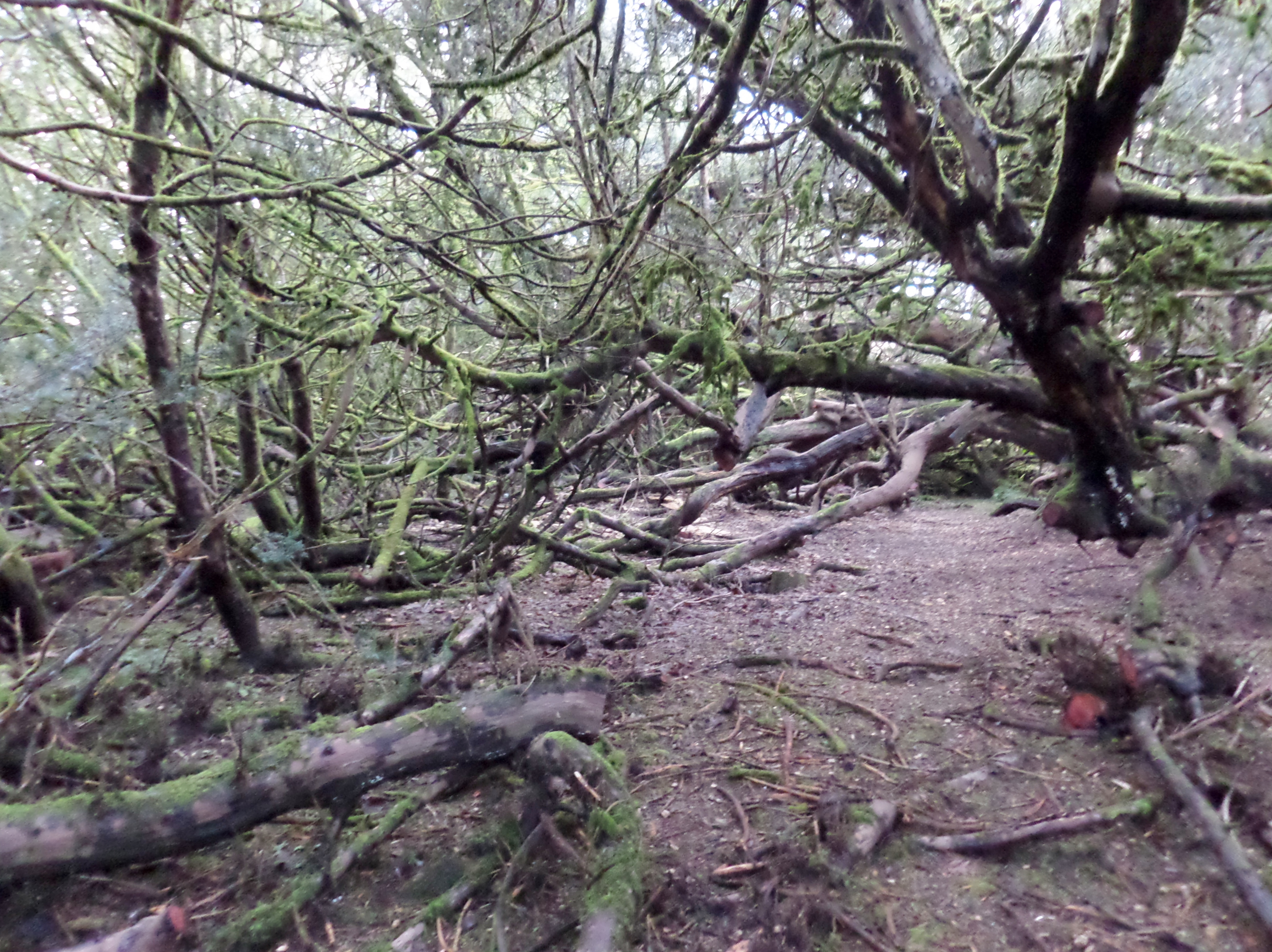
The Craigends Yew with its layering branches.

A very rare growth form is where the original parent tree forms a grove through the roots, rather than the stems, throw up clonal trees as suckers as with the Clan Fraser tree at Stratherrick near Fort Augustus. A typical yew tree growth form is the Defynnog Yew in Powys, Wales.

== History ==
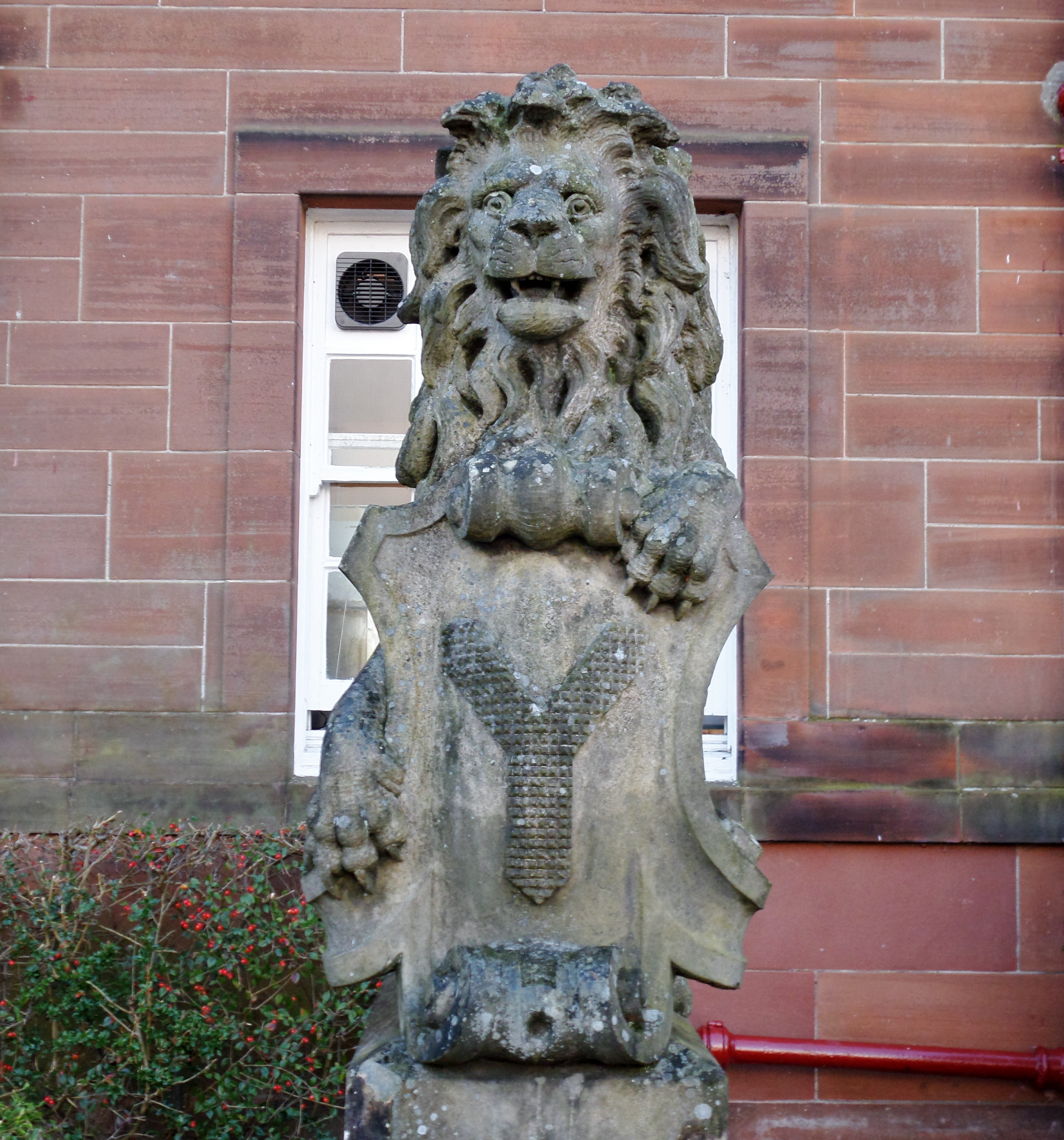
Coat of arms of the Cuninghames of Craigends.

In 1479 the lands of Craigends were granted to William Cuninghame (d. 1520), the second son of Alexander Cuninghame, the first Earl of Glencairn and this cadet branch established themselves at Craigends until the 20th century. The first fortified manor house was built by William. John Charles Cuninghame, the 17th and final laird died in 1917 and the estate passed to Alison Cuninghame, his widow. Alison died in 1958 and the estate then was inherited a nephew who sold the estate to the developers Taylor Woodrow. In 1971 the mansion house was demolished and by 1973, Taylor Woodrow had started construction on the first of what would be many housing estates within the grounds.

In 1818 the estate is recorded as being ..adorned with pleasant orchards and gardens, the seat of the ancient family and it may be that the Craigends Yew was amongst the first plantings on the estate by the Cuninghames in who held these lands from at least the time of Alexander Cuninghame (1426–1488), father of William, the first laird.

In 2016 the Craigends Yew was shortlisted for Scotland's Tree of the Year by the Woodland Trust.

== Layering yews in Scotland ==
Other examples of ancient layering yews can be found at Ormiston, Traquair House, Whittingehame and Broich, near Kippen.

== See also ==
- List of individual trees
- List of oldest trees
- List of Great British Trees
