= Church of Saint Digain =

Church in Wales

Coordinates: 53°11′32″N 3°41′07″W

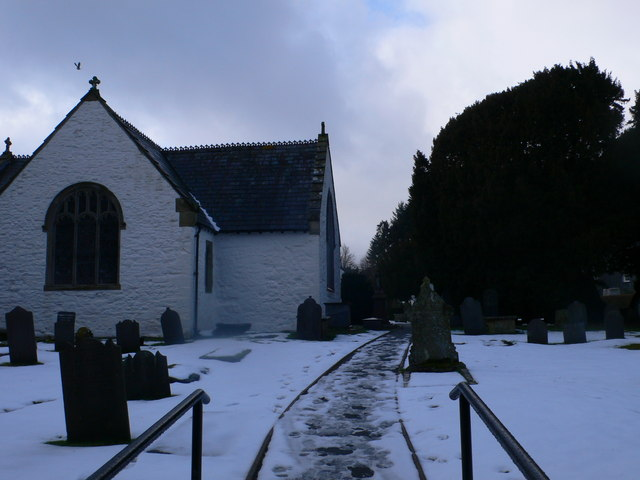
Church and yew at Llangernyw

The Church of St Digain is a Grade II* listed building in Llangernyw, Conwy County Borough, Wales. The church is dedicated to Saint Digain, who is said to have lived in the 5th century. The name of the village is translated as "the church of the Cornishman".

The church dates from medieval times but is much later than the time of Digain.

== Churchyard ==
The parish church stands south of the centre of a roughly oval-shaped churchyard.

In the churchyard is an ancient tree, the Llangernyw Yew. While yews are a typical species in Welsh churchyards, this one stands out for its age. Yews are difficult to date, but some authorities assume that it has been growing on the site since pre-Christian times.

The churchyard contains monuments to the Sandbach family of Hafodunos, including a listed mausoleum.
