= Llangernyw =

Village and community in Conwy, Wales

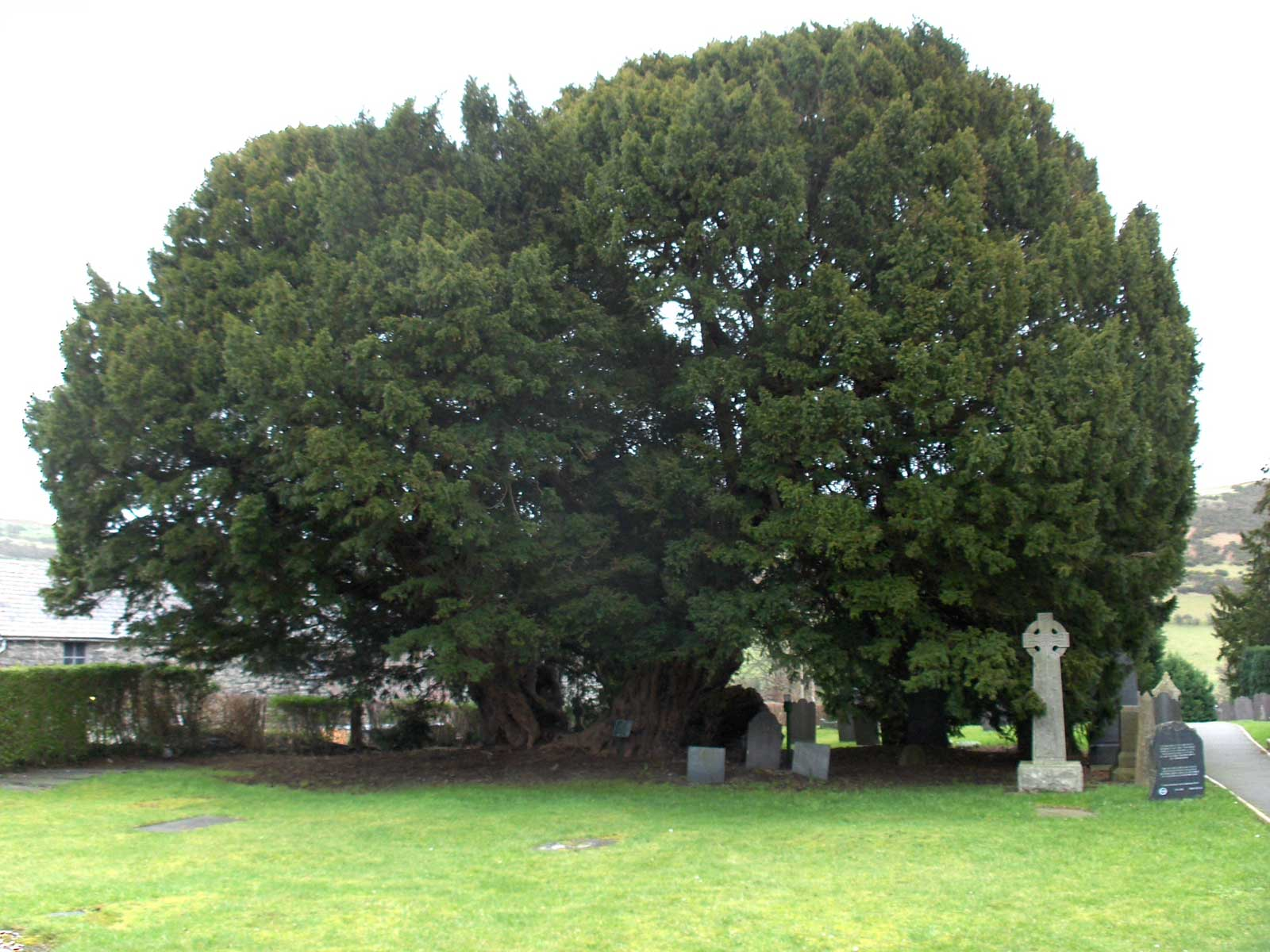
- The Llangernyw Yew is estimated to be around 1,500 to 5,000 years old

- Location within Conwy
- Population: 1,079 (2011)
- OS grid reference: SH874675
- Community: Llangernyw
- Principal area: Conwy
- Preserved county: Clwyd
- Country: Wales
- Sovereign state: United Kingdom
- Post town: ABERGELE
- Postcode district: LL22
- Dialling code: 01745
- Police: North Wales
- Fire: North Wales
- Ambulance: Welsh
- UK Parliament: Bangor Aberconwy
- Senedd Cymru – Welsh Parliament: Clwyd West
- List of places UK Wales Conwy 53°11′31″N 3°41′08″W Map of the community

Llangernyw ([ɬanˈgɛrnɨ̞u]) is a rural, mostly Welsh-speaking, village and community in Conwy County Borough, North Wales.

== Overview ==
At the 2011 census, the community had a population of 1,079 of whom 63.7 percent were Welsh speakers. The comparable figures for the 2001 census were a population of 982, 67 per cent of whom were Welsh speakers. The population of the village itself is around 400.

The village lies on the A548 between Llanrwst and Llanfair Talhaiarn, at the point where the Afon Cledwen, a tributary of the Afon Elwy, is crossed by the main road.

Situated on the outskirts of the village is Hafodunos Hall, a gothic mansion ravaged by fire in 2004, and currently being restored by a private owner.

The name of the village may have its origin in the Cornovii tribe of the West Midlands.

The churchyard of St Digain's church in Llangernyw is the site of an ancient yew tree, the Llangernyw Yew, estimated to be around 4,000 years old. This is thought to be the oldest living tree in Europe (see List of longest-living organisms).

Also of note is the Sir Henry Jones Museum, which is dedicated to the life of the philosopher and academic, Henry Jones, who grew up in the village. The museum is his childhood home, a small cottage, which has been preserved internally and externally.

The community includes the villages of Gwytherin and Pandy Tudur, plus the hamlet of Pentre Isaf, and extends up to, and includes part of, Mynydd Hiraethog.

== Governance ==
An electoral ward in the same name exists. This ward stretches to the south of Llangernyw Community and has a total population at the 2011 census of 1,435, and includes Pentrefoelas.
