= List of Great British Trees =

The Great British Trees were 50 trees selected by The Tree Council in 2002 to spotlight trees in the United Kingdom in honour of the Queen's Golden Jubilee.

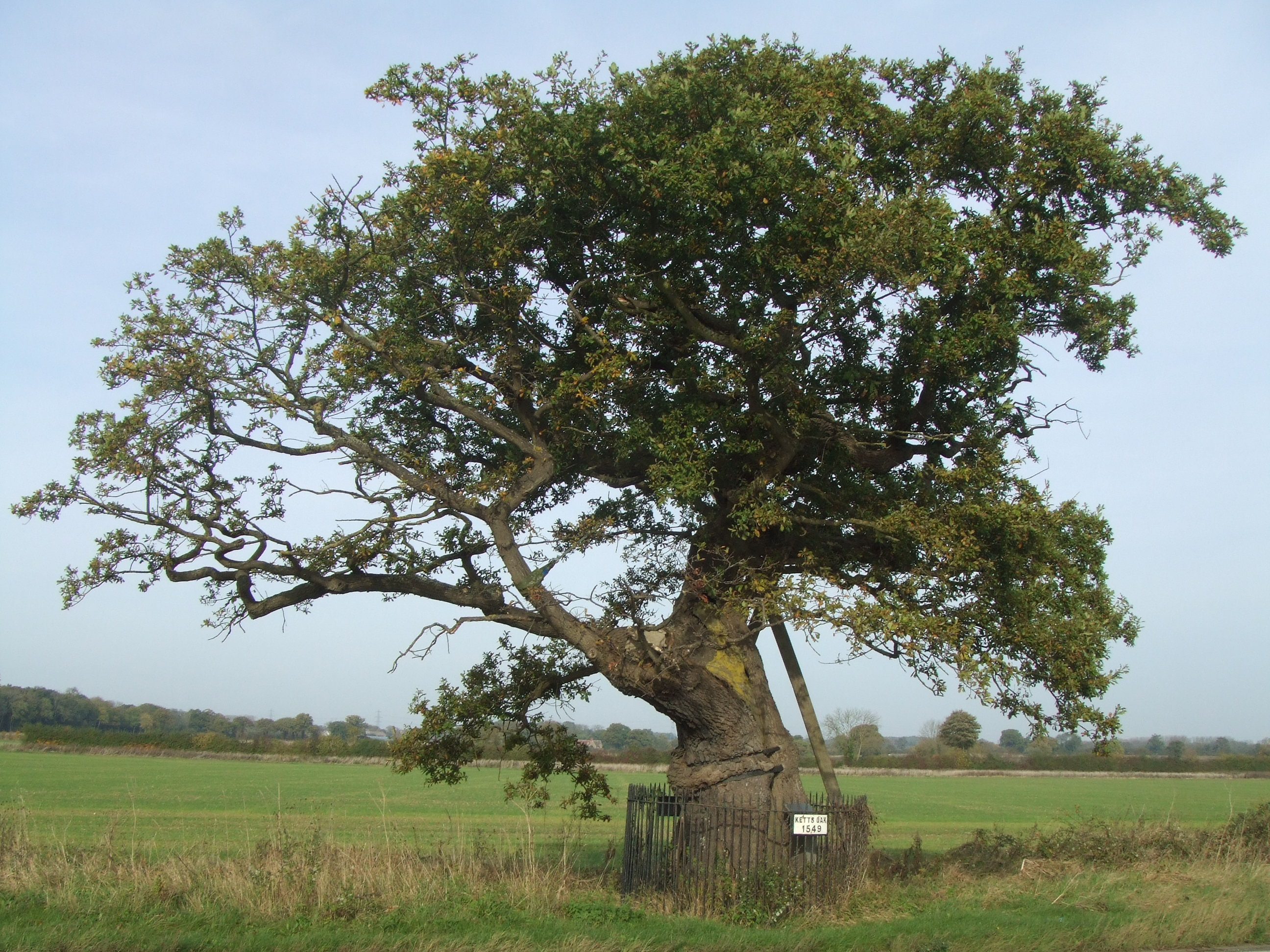
Kett's Oak, Hethersett

== England ==
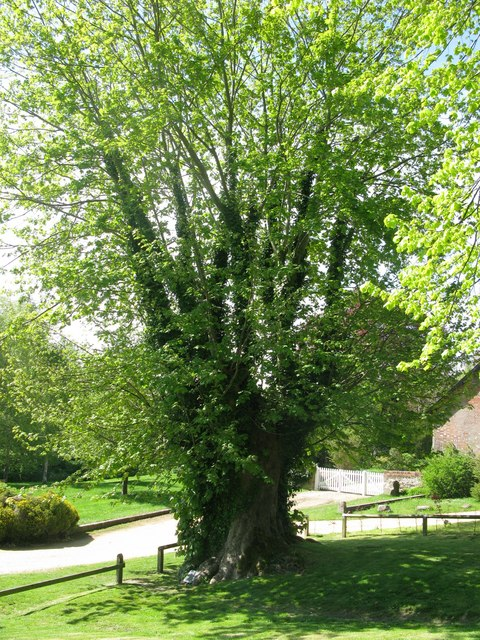
Tolpuddle Martyrs Tree

=== Western England ===
- Tortworth Chestnut at Tortworth, Gloucestershire
- Westonbirt Lime Tree in Westonbirt Arboretum, Gloucestershire
- Spanish Chestnut Avenue at Croft Castle, Herefordshire
- Royal Oak in Boscobel, Shropshire
- Bewdley Sweet Chestnut in Bewdley, Worcestershire

=== South West ===
- Domesday Oak in Ashton Court, Bristol
- Darley Oak, Upton Cross, Cornwall
- Bicton College Monkey Puzzle in Bicton Park, East Budleigh, Devon
- Heavitree Yew in Heavitree, near Exeter, Devon
- Ashbrittle Yew in Ashbrittle, Wellington, Somerset

=== Southern England ===
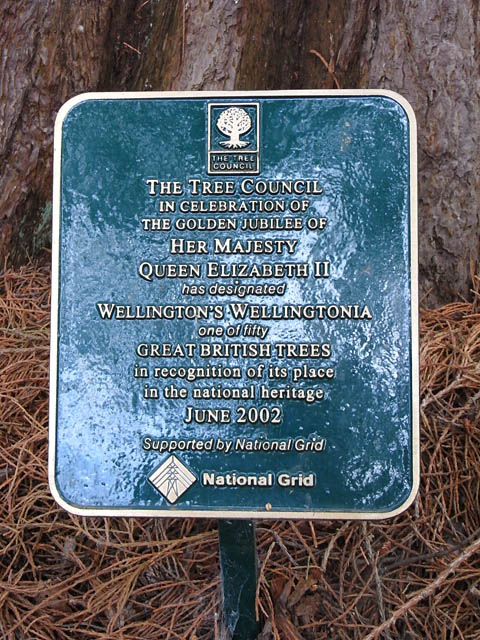
Wellingtonias were named in honour of the first Duke of Wellington, having been introduced to this country in 1853, a year after his death. The parent tree here was planted in 1857 by the second Duchess.

- Brighton Pavilion Elm in Brighton, East Sussex
- Queen Elizabeth Oak in Cowdray Park, Midhurst, West Sussex
- Selborne Yew in Selborne, Hampshire
- Wellington's Wellingtonia, a Giant Sequoia, in Stratfield Saye, Hampshire
- Tolpuddle Martyrs Tree in Dorset
- Big Belly Oak in Savernake Forest, Wiltshire

=== London and the Home Counties ===
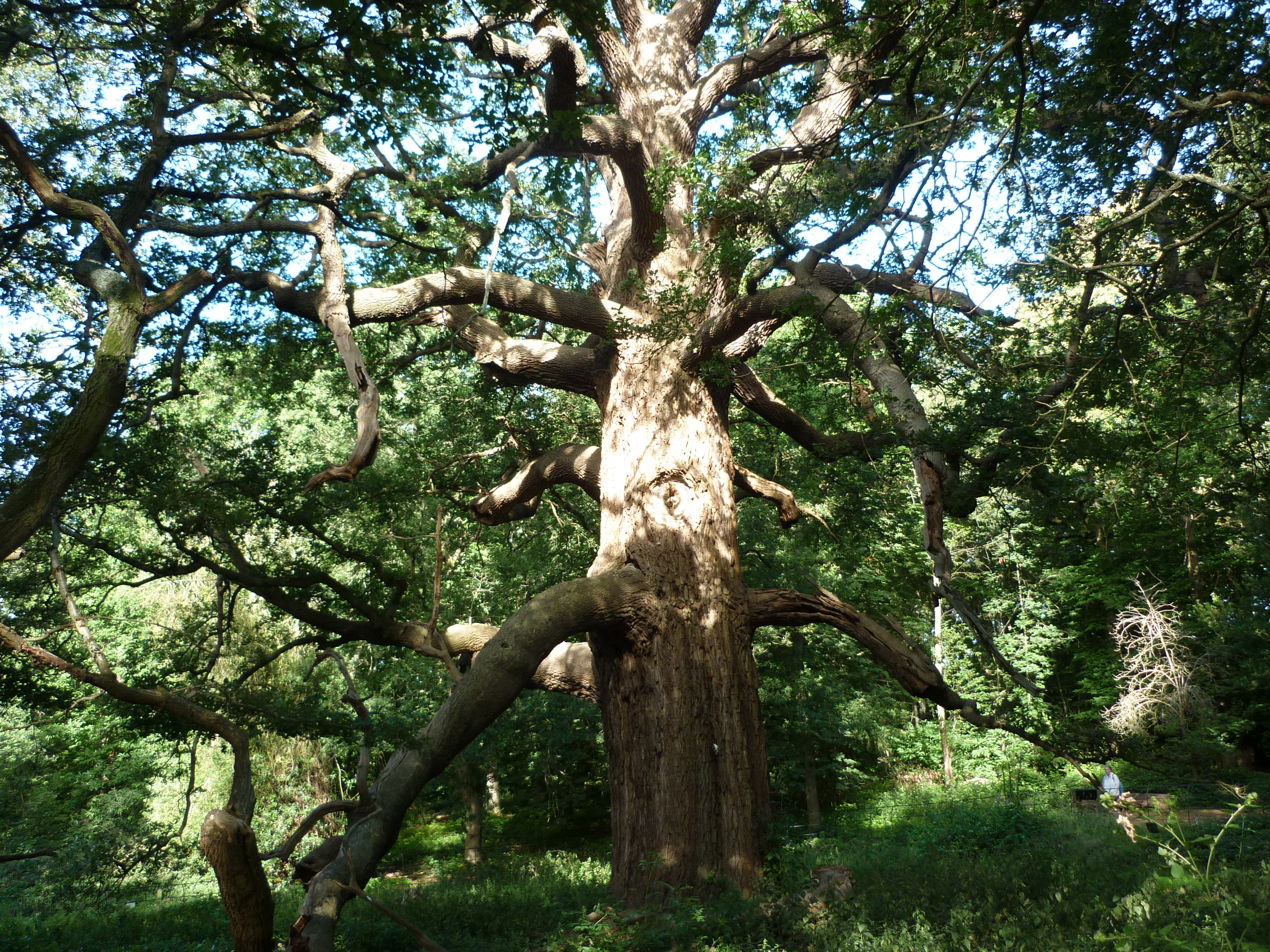
Great Oak in Panshanger Park

- The Cage Pollard in Burnham Beeches, Buckinghamshire
- Ankerwycke Yew in Wraysbury, Berkshire
- The World's End Black Poplar in Roydon, Essex
- The Great Oak, Panshanger Park in Hertingfordbury, Hertfordshire
- Sidney Oak in Penshurst Place, Kent
- Sweet chestnut 'The Seven Sisters Chestnut' in Viceroy's Wood, Penshurst, Kent NOTE this is not in the Tree Council’s original list.
- Charlton House Mulberry in Greenwich
- 'Old Lion' Ginkgo in Kew Gardens, Richmond, London
- Crowhurst Yew in Surrey

=== Eastern England ===
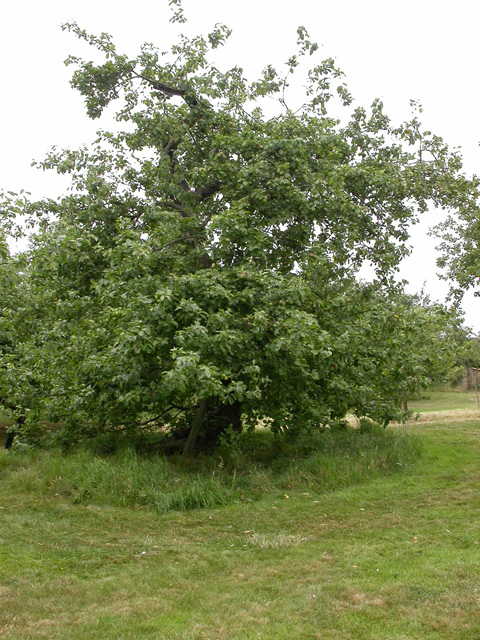
Newton's Apple Tree, Woolsthorpe Manor

- Metasequoia at Emmanuel College, Britain's first Dawn Redwood, in Cambridge University Botanic Garden
- Great London Plane of Ely, Britain's first London plane in Ely, Cambridgeshire
- Newton's Apple Tree in Woolsthorpe Manor, Grantham, Lincolnshire
- Bowthorpe Oak in Bourne, Lincolnshire
- Kett's Oak in Hethersett, Norfolk
- Chedgrave Jubilee Oak in Norfolk

=== The Midlands ===
- Morton Horse Chestnut in Derbyshire
- Lebanon Cedar in Childrey, Oxfordshire
- Major Oak in Sherwood Forest, Nottinghamshire, reported to have died in June 2026
- Original Bramley apple in Southwell, Nottinghamshire

=== Northern England ===
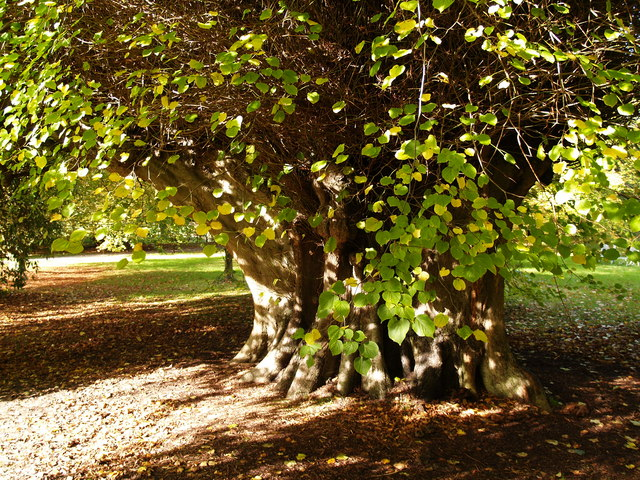
Holker Lime at Holker Hall

- The Appleton Thorn Tree in Appleton Thorn, Cheshire
- Marton Oak in Marton, Cheshire
- Borrowdale Yew in Cumbria
- Levens Hall Yew in Levens Hall, Cumbria
- Holker Lime at Holker Hall, Cumbria
- Wild Cherry in Fountains Abbey and Studley Royal, near Ripon, North Yorkshire

== Northern Ireland ==
- Great Yew, a pair of yews now appearing to be a single tree, in Crom Castle, County Fermanagh

== Scotland ==
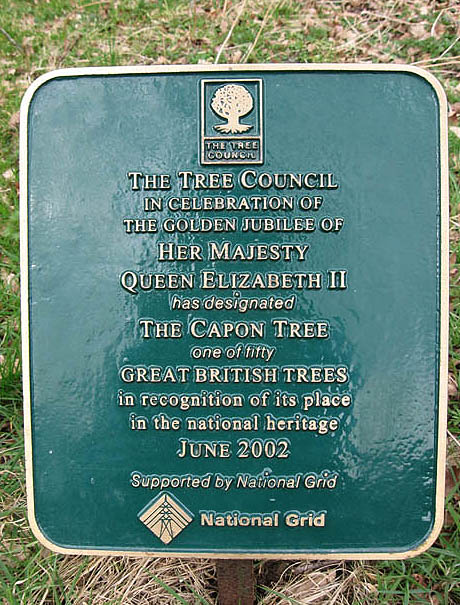
Capon Tree plaque

- A silver fir, in Ardkinglas Woodland Garden, Argyll
- Capon Tree, an oak in what used to be the Jedforest, Jedburgh, Borders
- Granny Pine, a 300-year-old Scots Pine at Glen Affric, Highlands
- Fortingall Yew, a 2,000-3,000-year-old yew in Perth and Kinross
- Parent Larch, a European Larch in the grounds of a Hilton hotel built by the Duke of Atholl in Dunkeld, Perth and Kinross
- A Douglas-fir, in the grounds of Scone Palace where David Douglas was born, in Perth and Kinross

== Wales ==
- Ley's Whitebeam, one of only 16 Sorbus leyana (a type of whitebeam) growing wild anywhere, in Merthyr Tydfil
- Pontfadog Oak, with a girth of 12.9 metres (42 ft), the largest Sessile oak in Wales, in Pontfadog, Wrexham. The tree was blown over by the wind in 2013.
- Llangernyw Yew, the oldest tree in Europe (Between 4,000 and 5,000 years old), a yew in St Digain’s churchyard, Llangernyw, Conwy County Borough.

== See also ==
- List of individual trees
- Great Trees of London
- Tree of the Year
