= Queen Elizabeth Oak =

Tree in Cowdray Park, West Sussex, England

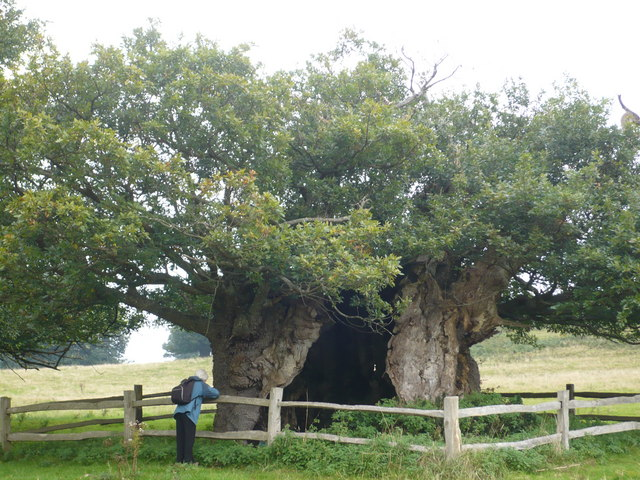
- Queen Elizabeth Oak in September 2008
- Interactive map of Queen Elizabeth Oak
- Species: Sessile oak (Quercus petraea)
- Location: Cowdray Park near Lodsworth, West Sussex, England
- Coordinates: 50°59′46″N 0°42′02″W
- Girth: 12.5–12.8 metres (41–42 ft)
- Date seeded: Between 1000–1200 AD
- Custodian: Michael Pearson, 4th Viscount Cowdray
- Website: Woodland Trust record

The Queen Elizabeth Oak is a large sessile oak tree (Quercus petraea) in Cowdray Park near the village of Lodsworth in the Western Weald, West Sussex, England. It lies within the South Downs National Park. It has a girth of 12.5–12.8 metres (41–42 ft), and is about 800–1,000 years old. According to this estimate it began to grow in the 11th or 12th century AD. In June 2002, The Tree Council designated the Queen Elizabeth Oak, one of fifty Great British Trees, in recognition of its place in the national heritage. According to the Woodland Trust's measurements in 2008, the tree was the third largest sessile oak tree to be recorded in the United Kingdom after the Pontfadog Oak in Wales (which was blown over in 18 April 2013) and the Marton Oak in Cheshire, although this tree is now fragmented.

According to legend, Queen Elizabeth I stood near the tree with an arrow ready in her bow waiting for a stag to be driven within range for her to shoot it, although she was unsuccessful.

== See also ==
- List of individual trees
- List of Great British Trees
