= Grade II listed buildings in Glyntraian =

Map of the community in Wrexham County Borough.

In the United Kingdom, the term listed building refers to a building or other structure officially designated as being of special architectural, historical, or cultural significance; Grade II structures are those considered to be "buildings of special interest which justify every effort being made to preserve them". Listing was begun by a provision in the Town and Country Planning Act 1947. Once listed, strict limitations are imposed on the modifications allowed to a building's structure or fittings. In Wales, the authority for listing under the Planning (Listed Buildings and Conservation Areas) Act 1990 rests with Cadw.

This is a list of the 25 Grade II listed buildings in the community of Glyntraian, in Wrexham County Borough.

Name	Location Grid Ref. (Note: Sometimes known as OSGB36, the grid reference is based on the British national grid reference system used by the Ordnance Survey.) Geo-coordinates	Date Listed	Type/Function	Notes	Reference Number	Image
Briwnant Farmhouse	Glyntraian; SJ2328635884; 52.914879°N 3.1422919°W	29 July 1994	Domestic		15656	–
Bryn Rodyn	Glyntraian; SJ2579937668; 52.931267°N 3.1053362°W	18 February 2003	Domestic		80883	–
Cae-mor Farmhouse and adjoining farm building	Glyntraian; SJ2281535982; 52.915692°N 3.1493182°W	18 February 2003	Domestic		80884	–
Castle Mill Bridge	Glyntraian; SJ2637637579; 52.930546°N 3.0967336°W	18 February 2003	Commercial		80885	–
Cow-house with attached Cart-shed and Stables at Llangwryd Uchaf	Glyntraian; SJ2327036266; 52.91831°N 3.1426202°W	18 February 2003	Religious, Ritual and Funerary		80886	–
Farm Ranges at Wern Tower	Glyntraian; SJ2559039289; 52.945806°N 3.1088173°W	18 February 2003	Domestic		80887	–
Field Barn to North of Er Wallo	Glyntraian; SJ2181738209; 52.935563°N 3.164694°W	18 February 2003	Agriculture and Subsistence		80888	–
Former Waiting Room, Glyn Valley Tramway, Dolywern	Glyntraian; SJ2207837204; 52.926569°N 3.1605699°W	18 February 2003	Commercial		80889	–
Former Waiting Room, Glyn Valley Tramway, Pontfadog	Glyntraian; SJ2342838087; 52.934699°N 3.1407011°W	18 February 2003	Agriculture and Subsistence		80890	–
Granary and attached Stable Range at Llwynmawr Farm	Glyntraian; SJ2240036827; 52.923227°N 3.1556908°W	18 February 2003	Domestic		80891	–
Llangwryd Uchaf and adjoining farm building	Glyntraian; SJ2328636291; 52.918537°N 3.1423882°W	18 February 2003	Domestic		80892	–
Llwynmawr Farmhouse	Glyntraian; SJ2236536824; 52.923195°N 3.1562106°W	4 January 1966	Domestic		629	–
Milestone at Dolywern	Glyntraian; SJ2208437278; 52.927234°N 3.1604985°W	18 February 2003	Commercial		80893	–
Milestone at Pontfadog	Glyntraian; SJ2340038027; 52.934156°N 3.1411034°W	18 February 2003	Industrial		80894	–
Multi-purpose Farm Building at Briwnant Farm	Glyntraian; SJ2328735903; 52.91505°N 3.1422816°W	29 July 1994	Domestic		15657	–
Multi-purpose Farm Building at Llwynmawr Farm	Glyntraian; SJ2239036842; 52.92336°N 3.1558431°W	4 January 1966	Domestic		630	–
Multi-purpose Farm Building at Ty'n-llwyn Farm	Glyntraian; SJ2267337109; 52.925801°N 3.1516983°W	18 February 2003	Gardens, Parks and Urban Spaces		80895	–
Pant-du-uchaf	Glyntraian; SJ2522939748; 52.949881°N 3.1142947°W	18 February 2003	Religious, Ritual and Funerary		80896	–
Pontfadog Bridge	Glyntraian; SJ2341637998; 52.933897°N 3.1408586°W	18 February 2003	Recreational		80897	–
Pontfadog War Memorial	Glyntraian; SJ2339538009; 52.933993°N 3.1411736°W	18 February 2003	Industrial		80898	–
Talygarth Isaf Farm	Glyntraian; SJ2166437394; 52.928216°N 3.1667729°W	18 February 2003	Domestic		80899	–
Tan-y-Garth including garden terrace and entrance staircase	Glyntraian; SJ2371838485; 52.938317°N 3.1364811°W	29 April 2004	Domestic		82643	–
Tu-hwnt-i'r-nant	Glyntraian; SJ2168736357; 52.918899°N 3.1661803°W	18 February 2003			80900	–
Ty'n-llwyn Farmhouse	Glyntraian; SJ2270337095; 52.925679°N 3.1512488°W	18 February 2003	Domestic		80901	–
Wern Tower	Glyntraian; SJ2560839292; 52.945836°N 3.1085502°W	18 February 2003	Domestic		80902	–

== See also ==
- Grade II listed buildings in Wrexham County Borough
