= Llwynmawr =

Village in Wales

Coordinates: 52°55′32″N 3°09′27″W

Llwynmawr (Welsh: Llwyn-mawr) is a village in the Ceiriog Valley in North Wales, about halfway between the villages of Glyn Ceiriog and Pontfadog, in the community of Glyntraian. The name means "big grove".
