= Church of St John the Baptist, Ashbrittle =

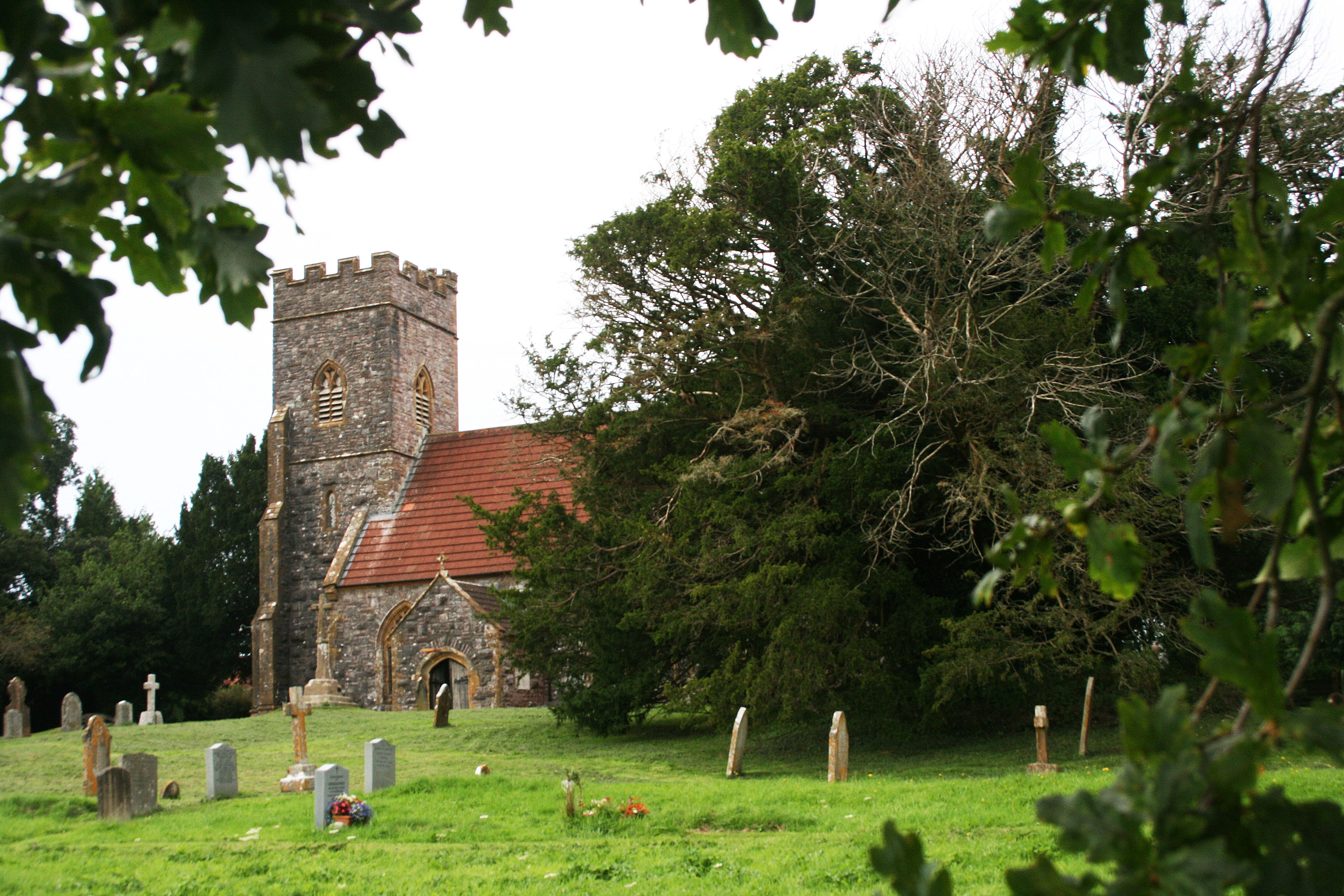
- Ashbrittle church and ancient yew tree

- Location within Somerset
- 50.9838°N 3.3519°W
- Location: Ashbrittle, Somerset
- Country: England
- Denomination: Church of England
- Churchmanship: Conservative Evangelical

History
- Status: Active

Architecture
- Functional status: Parish church
- Heritage designation: Grade II* listed
- Designated: 25 January 1956
- Completed: 14th century

The Church of St John the Baptist is a Church of England parish church in Ashbrittle, Somerset. It was built in the 15th century, and is a Grade II* listed building.

== History ==
The church was built in the 15th century and underwent extensive Victorian restoration around 1874. The restoration included installing a clock. At the same time a spring was discovered under the church.

=== Present day ===
The parish is part of the Wellington and District benefice within the Diocese of Bath and Wells.

The church stands in the Conservative Evangelical tradition of the Church of England.

== Architecture ==
The red sandstone building has hamstone dressings. It consists of a three-bay nave, chancel and three -stage west tower. One of the stained glass windows was donated by Edward Watkin in memory of his grandmother.

In the churchyard is a 3- 4,000 year old Yew tree (Taxus baccata) in the village was among the Great British Trees list that included 50 trees selected by the Tree Council in 2002 to spotlight trees in Great Britain in honour of the Queen's Golden Jubilee. The tree is growing on the top of a Bronze Age Bowl barrow. It is no longer one solid tree having divided into seven separate trunks in a circle with a diameter of 42 feet (13 m).

== See also ==
- List of ecclesiastical parishes in the Diocese of Bath and Wells
