= Ashbrittle =

Village and civil parish in Somerset, England

Coordinates: 50.9846°N 3.3519°W

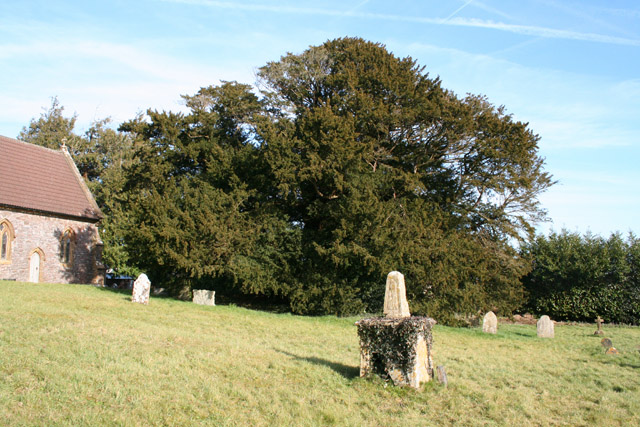
- The Ashbrittle Yew Tree

- Location within Somerset
- Population: 225 (2011)
- OS grid reference: ST051214
- Unitary authority: Somerset Council
- Ceremonial county: Somerset
- Region: South West
- Country: England
- Sovereign state: United Kingdom
- Post town: Wellington
- Postcode district: TA21
- Police: Avon and Somerset
- Fire: Devon and Somerset
- Ambulance: South Western
- UK Parliament: Tiverton and Minehead

Ashbrittle is a village and civil parish in Somerset, England, situated nine miles west of Taunton and close to the River Tone and the route of the Grand Western Canal. The village has a population of 225.

== History ==
The parish of Ashbrittle was part of the Milverton Hundred.

The Ashbrittle Yew is a 3000– 4,000 year old Yew tree (Taxus baccata) in the village was among the Great British Trees list that included 50 trees selected by the Tree Council in 2002 to spotlight trees in Great Britain in honour of the Queen's Golden Jubilee. The tree is growing on the top of a Bronze Age Bowl barrow. It is no longer one solid tree having divided into seven separate trunks in a circle with a diameter of 42 feet (13 m).

Court Place Farmhouse was built in the late 15th century and has undergone several renovations and extensions since. It is a Grade II listed building.

The film Luna de Miel received its first UK showing in its restored form, in the village, after restoration by Charles Doble, on 21 June 2003.

The novels Two Cows and a Vanful of Smoke and Isabel's Skin by Peter Benson, who lived in Ashbrittle during the 1970s, are set in the village and its surrounding area.

== Governance ==
The parish council has responsibility for local issues, including setting an annual precept (local rate) to cover the council's operating costs and producing annual accounts for public scrutiny. The parish council evaluates local planning applications and works with the local police, district council officers, and neighbourhood watch groups on matters of crime, security, and traffic. The parish council's role also includes initiating projects for the maintenance and repair of parish facilities, as well as consulting with the district council on the maintenance, repair, and improvement of highways, drainage, footpaths, public transport, and street cleaning. Conservation matters (including trees and listed buildings) and environmental issues are also the responsibility of the council.

For local government purposes, since 1 April 2023, the village comes under the unitary authority of Somerset Council. Prior to this, it was part of the non-metropolitan district of Somerset West and Taunton (formed on 1 April 2019) and, before this, the district of Taunton Deane (established under the Local Government Act 1972). From 1894 to 1974, for local government purposes, Ashbrittle was part of Wellington Rural District.

The village is represented in the House of Commons of the Parliament of the United Kingdom as part of the Tiverton and Minehead county constituency. It elects one member of parliament (MP) by the first past the post system of election. Ashbrittle was part of the South West England constituency of the European Parliament prior to Britain leaving the European Union in January 2020 (which elected seven MEPs using the d'Hondt method of party-list proportional representation).

== Religious sites ==
The Church of St John the Baptist dates from the 15th century and has been designated as a grade II* listed building.
