= Tolpuddle Martyrs Tree =

Sycamore tree locating Tolpuddle Martyrs

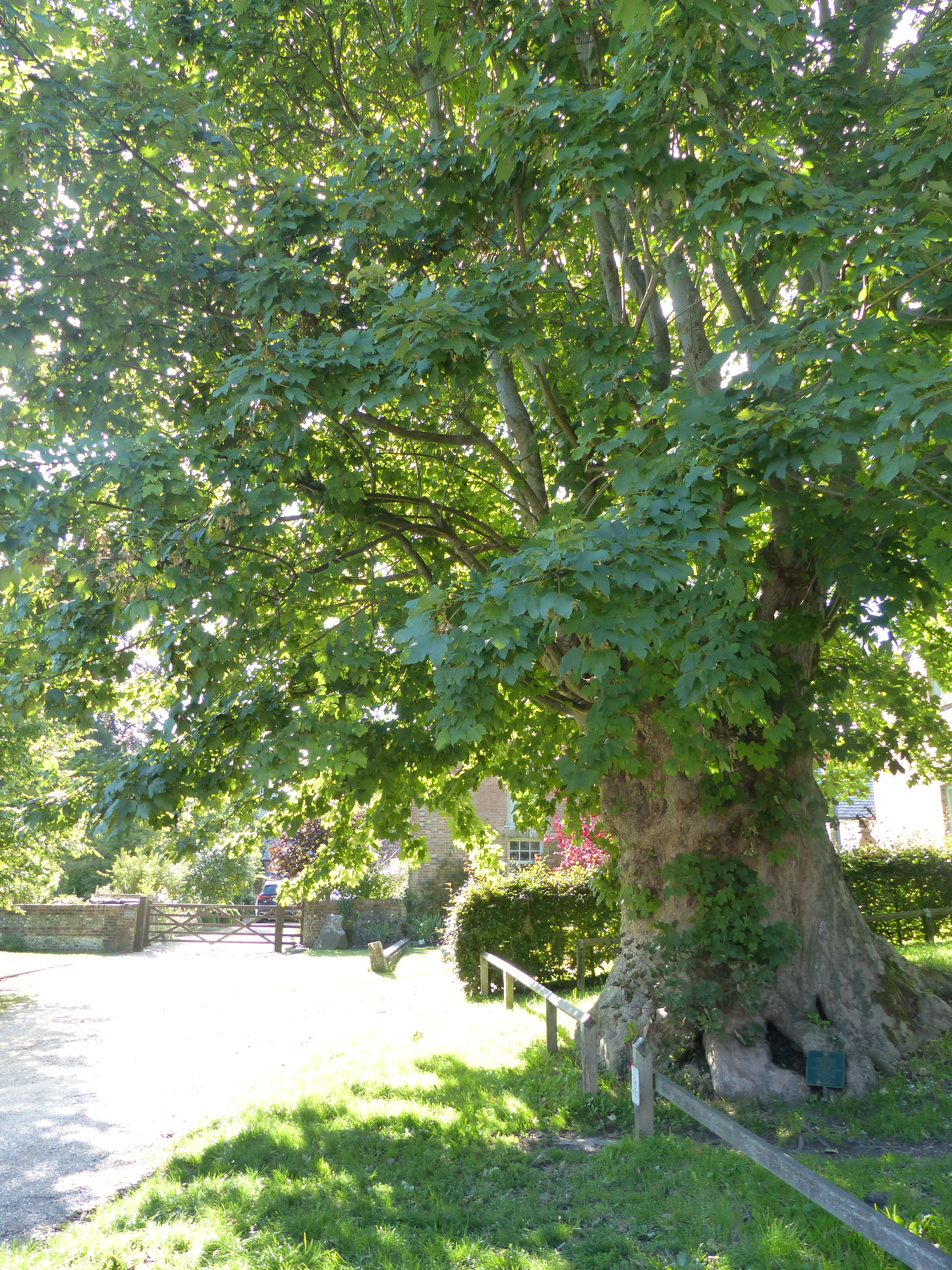
Tolpuddle Martyrs' Tree in August 2020

The Tolpuddle Martyrs' Tree is a sycamore tree in the village of Tolpuddle, Dorset. The tree is approximately 336 years old. It has become associated with the birth of the trade unionist movement.

== History ==
In 1833, the tree was used as a meeting point for six local agricultural labourers to discuss low wages and poor living conditions under their employers. Trees have been used for centuries as meeting places to discuss, and celebrate, offering shelter and a landmark; however, as a public space, people had to be careful what they talked about. The employers of the six labourers, wishing to quash this dissent and supported by the government, ordered the men's arrest and in 1834, they were trialled in the nearby town of Dorchester under the Incitement to Mutiny Act 1797. Convicted of swearing a secret oath, the 'Tolpuddle Martyrs' (as they came to be known) were sentenced to seven years of penal labour in Australia and were transported to Botany Bay. Their plight gained public attention through protests and petitions. The public protest caused an embarrassed government to overturn the ruling, and after three years' labour as sheep farmers the men were freed and returned to England.

Subsequently, the sycamore became a symbol of the birthplace of the trade union movement, providing "a symbol of hope for those whose lives are far from easy".

== The tree ==
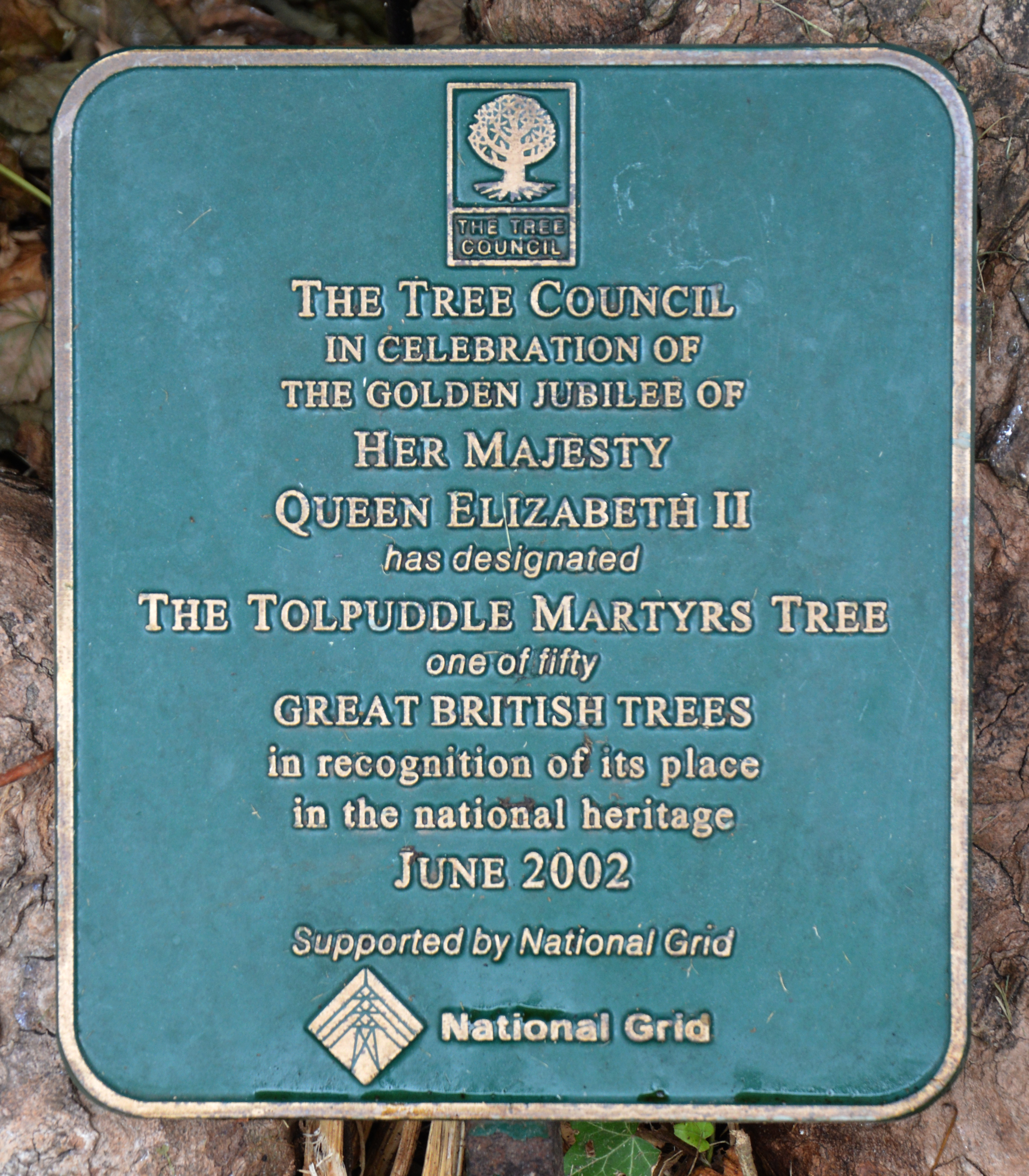
Small plaque at the bottom of the tree, signaling its selection as one of 50 Great British Trees in 2002.

The tree is a sycamore (Acer pseudoplatanus). It was determined to be 320 years old in 2005, making it 150 years old when the Tolpuddle Martyrs used it as a meeting place. It is the largest sycamore in Dorset, with a girth of 1.3 metres (4 ft 3 in). The sycamore is managed by the National Trust, which regularly pollards the tree to reduce weight on its branches and encourage crown growth. It is hoped this will increase the tree's lifespan to two centuries more.

The tree has inspired numerous creative projects. The shelter and relief it provided the Tolpuddle Martyrs is consistent with its other symbolic appearances in literature and the arts. The tree was selected among 50 Great British Trees to commemorate the Queen's Golden Jubilee in 2002. It was shortlisted as England's Tree of the Year in 2015.
