= Capon Tree =

Old tree near Jedburgh, Scotland

Coordinates: 55.46219°N 2.554628°W

Capon Oak Tree
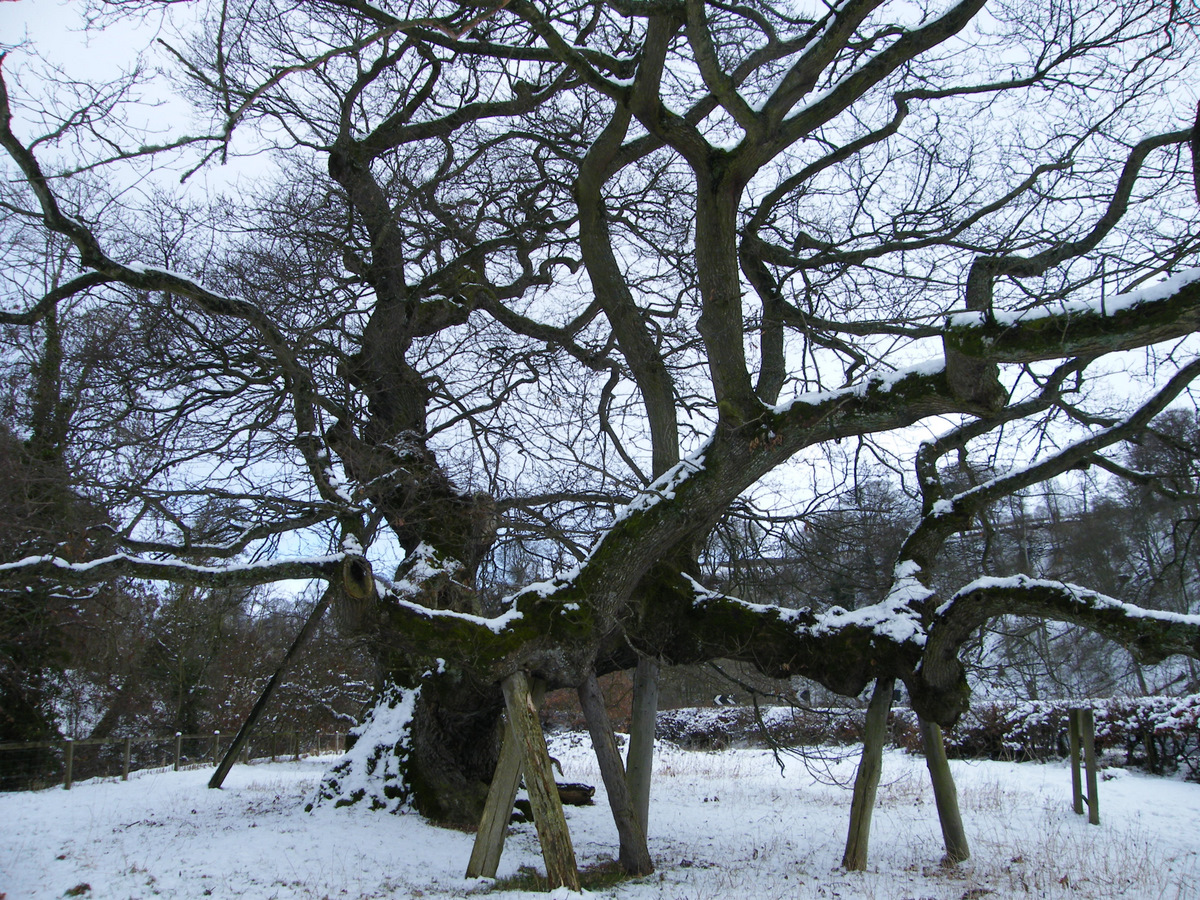
- The Capon Tree in 2009
- Interactive map of Capon Oak Tree
- Species: Sessile Oak (Quercus petraea)
- Location: Jedforest, Scottish Borders
- Girth: ~10 metres

The Capon Oak Tree is one of the last surviving trees of the ancient Scottish Jedforest. It is close to the A68 and Jed Water, a small river which has cut a course below soft sandstone cliffs. The Sessile Oak tree was said to be in the top fifty trees in the UK in 2002 and in the top 10 in 2024.

== Description ==
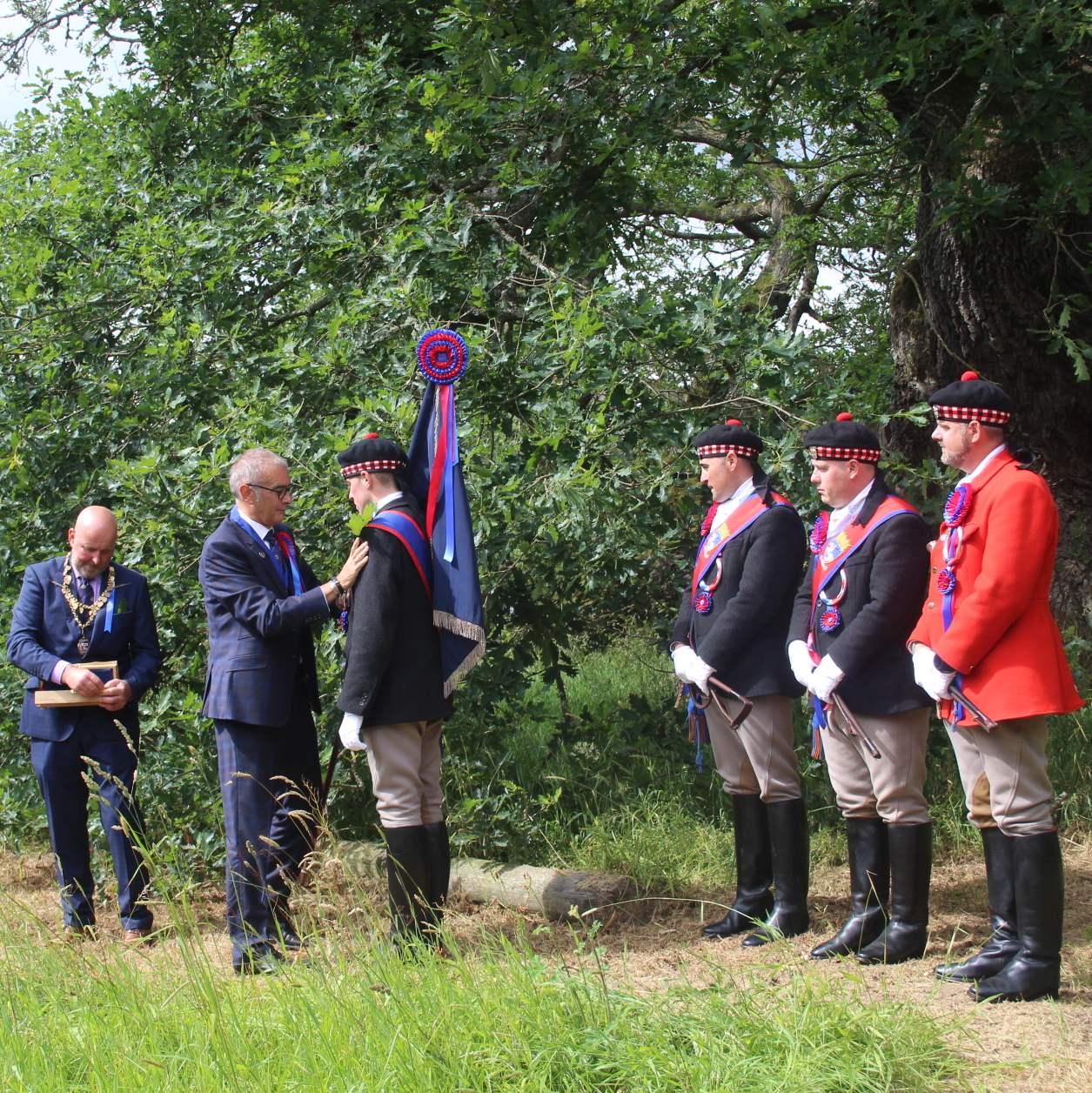
The Jedburgh Callant receiving his sprig in 2023

It is located 2 miles (3.2 km) south of Jedburgh, Scotland, west of the A68. The Capon Tree is held together with concrete, bricks and timber beams supporting its trunk and branches due to a massive split down the middle of the trunk. The tree's trunk is about ten metres in diameter and it continued to grow in 2022. The tree is estimated to be about 1,000 years old and it may have survived being felled because of its distorted shape making its wood useless for making ships. In 2002 grants were given to enable work to extend its life. It is an important icon and for 75 years the tree is visited annually during the annual Jethart Callant's Festival where the Callant is decorated with a sprig from the Capon tree. The Capon Tree was one of the 50 Great British Trees selected by The Tree Council in 2002 the year of the Queen's Golden Jubilee and in 2024 it was in the short list for "Tree of the Year".

Trees are being replanted in the Borders to establish a renewal of the ancient 'Caledon Wood,' or great northern forest, which included Ettrick Forest and Jedforest.

== See also ==
- List of Great British Trees
