= Kett's Oak =

Historic oak tree in Norfolk

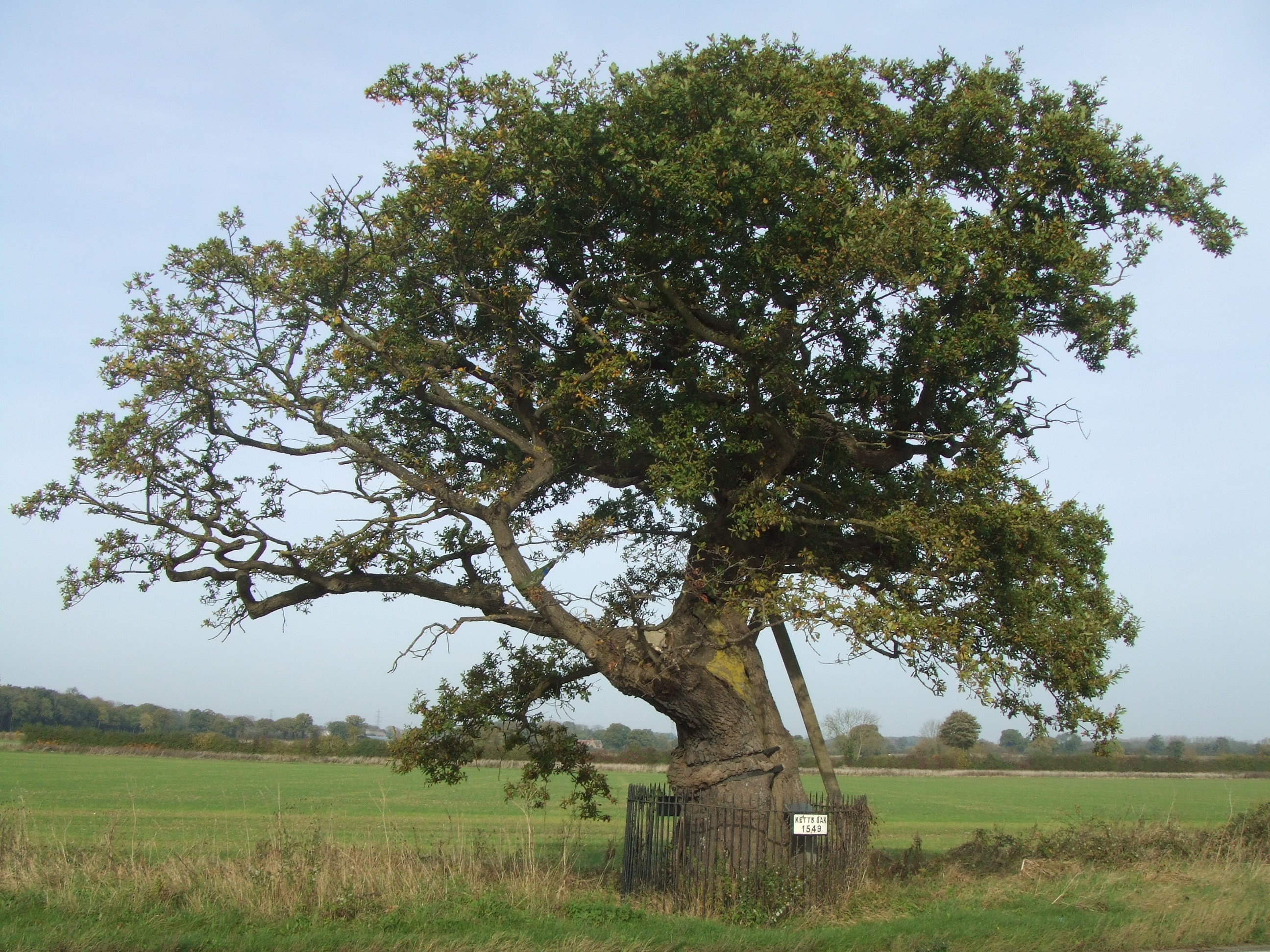
- Kett's Oak in June 2006.
- Interactive map of Kett's Oak
- Species: English oak (Quercus robur)
- Location: B1172 road between Wymondham and Hethersett
- Coordinates: 52°35′16″N 1°9′21″E

Kett's Oak is one of the 50 Great British Trees. The ancient oak tree (Quercus robur) is located at the side of the B1172 road between Wymondham and Hethersett in Norfolk, England.

The tree is the traditional location where in 1549 Robert Kett and his brother William addressed a group of men in what was to become Kett's Rebellion. Their grievances concerned the enclosing of the common lands and the rising cost of living. The rebellion failed and several rebels including Robert and William Kett were hanged.

The tree is in poor condition. A split has been filled with cement and the tree is bound with iron bands. In August 2020, Norfolk County Council applied biochar to the roots to improve its health.

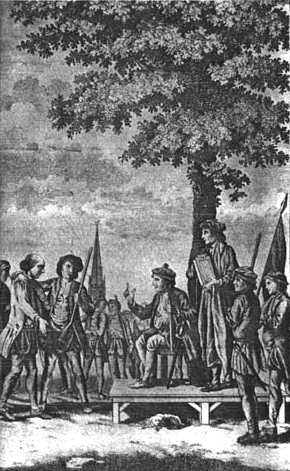
A similar gathering at the Oak of Reformation on Mousehold Heath, during Robert Kett's rebellion of 1549 (18th-century engraving).

== See also ==
- List of Great British Trees
- List of individual trees
