= Tortworth =

Village in Gloucestershire, England

Coordinates: 51.633333°N 2.433333°W

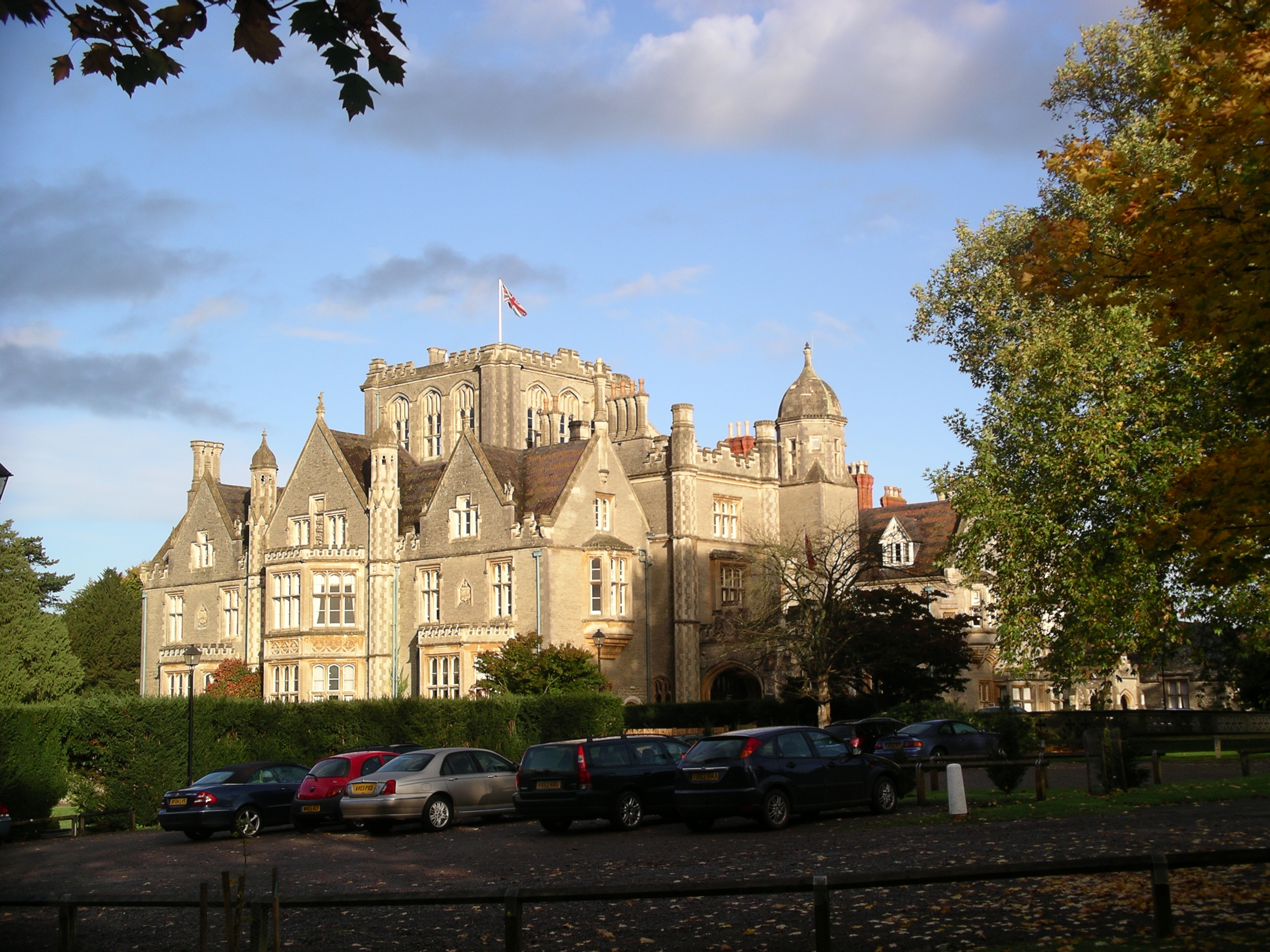
- Tortworth Court

- Location within Gloucestershire
- Population: 147
- OS grid reference: ST7093
- Civil parish: Tortworth
- Unitary authority: South Gloucestershire
- Ceremonial county: Gloucestershire
- Region: South West
- Country: England
- Sovereign state: United Kingdom
- Post town: Wotton-under-Edge
- Postcode district: GL12
- Police: Avon and Somerset
- Fire: Avon
- Ambulance: South Western
- UK Parliament: Thornbury and Yate

Tortworth is a small village and civil parish, near Thornbury in Gloucestershire, England. It has a population of 147 as of 2011. It lies on the B4509 road, which crosses the M5 motorway to the west of Tortworth.

== History ==
In the Domesday Book of 1086 the manor is recorded as held by Turstin FitzRolf. Tortworth is noted for its ancient chestnut tree in St. Leonard's churchyard, which became known as the "Great Chestnut of Tortworth" as early as 1150. This tree measured 51 feet in circumference at 6 feet from the ground in 1720. The tree is one of fifty Great British Trees, selected in 2002 by The Tree Council to commemorate the Queen's Golden Jubilee.

== Geography ==
The Tortworth inlier is the most complete section of "Silurian" rocks in the Bristol and South Gloucestershire area. Old red sandstone is most dominant.

== Notable landmarks ==
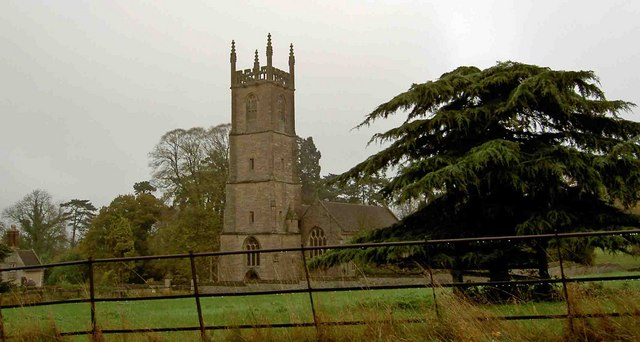
St Leonard's Church, Tortworth

The civil parish contains Tortworth Court. It was formerly the home of the Earls of Ducie, but is now run as a hotel. Tortworth Rectory belonged to Oriel College, Oxford. It was renowned for its library collection, which was eventually purchased by the Earls of Ducie.

There is a national prison nearby, HM Prison Leyhill, which was converted into a prison from an army hospital in the post-war period. In 1985 the prison won the Windlesham Trophy for the best-kept prison gardens.
