= Big Belly Oak =

Ancient oak tree in the Savernake Forest in Wiltshire, England

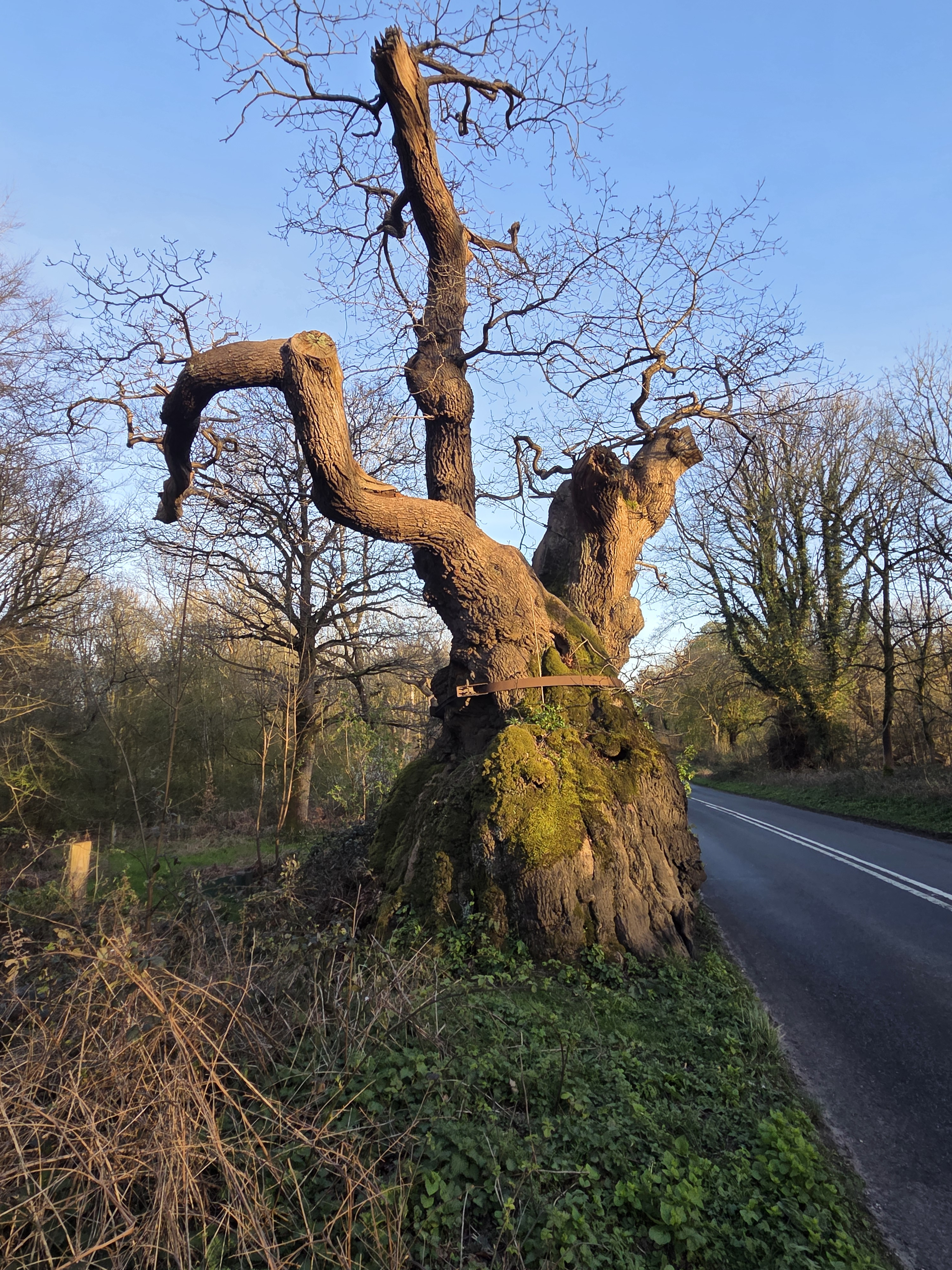
The Big Belly Oak in April 2026

The Big Belly Oak (also known as the Big Bellied Oak) is an ancient oak tree in the Savernake Forest in Wiltshire, England. The Big Belly Oak is the oldest oak in the Savernake Forest; it was planted around the year 1000, making it approximately 1,000 years old. It would have been a young tree at around the time that William the Conqueror defeated King Harold in 1066. As part of Queen Elizabeth II’s Golden Jubilee celebrations in 2002, the Big Belly Oak was named as one of 50 Great British Trees, a collection of significant trees in the United Kingdom.

The Big Belly Oak is a sessile oak tree (Quercus petraea). It is enormously fat, with a maximum girth of 11.18 metres at a height of 1.20m. Its estimated volume is 40m³. The oak has a large cavity in its centre, likely an effect of pollarding. In 2014, the Big Belly Oak was shortlisted for Tree of the Year in the annual competition held by the Woodland Trust.

The Big Belly Oak grows by the side of the A346 road between Marlborough and Burbage. It is one of many ancient oak trees in the Savernake Forest, including the New Queen Oak, the Queen Oak, the Saddle Oak 1, the Spider Oak; the Cathedral Oak, and the King of Limbs.
