= Ashbrittle Yew =

Tree in Somerset, England

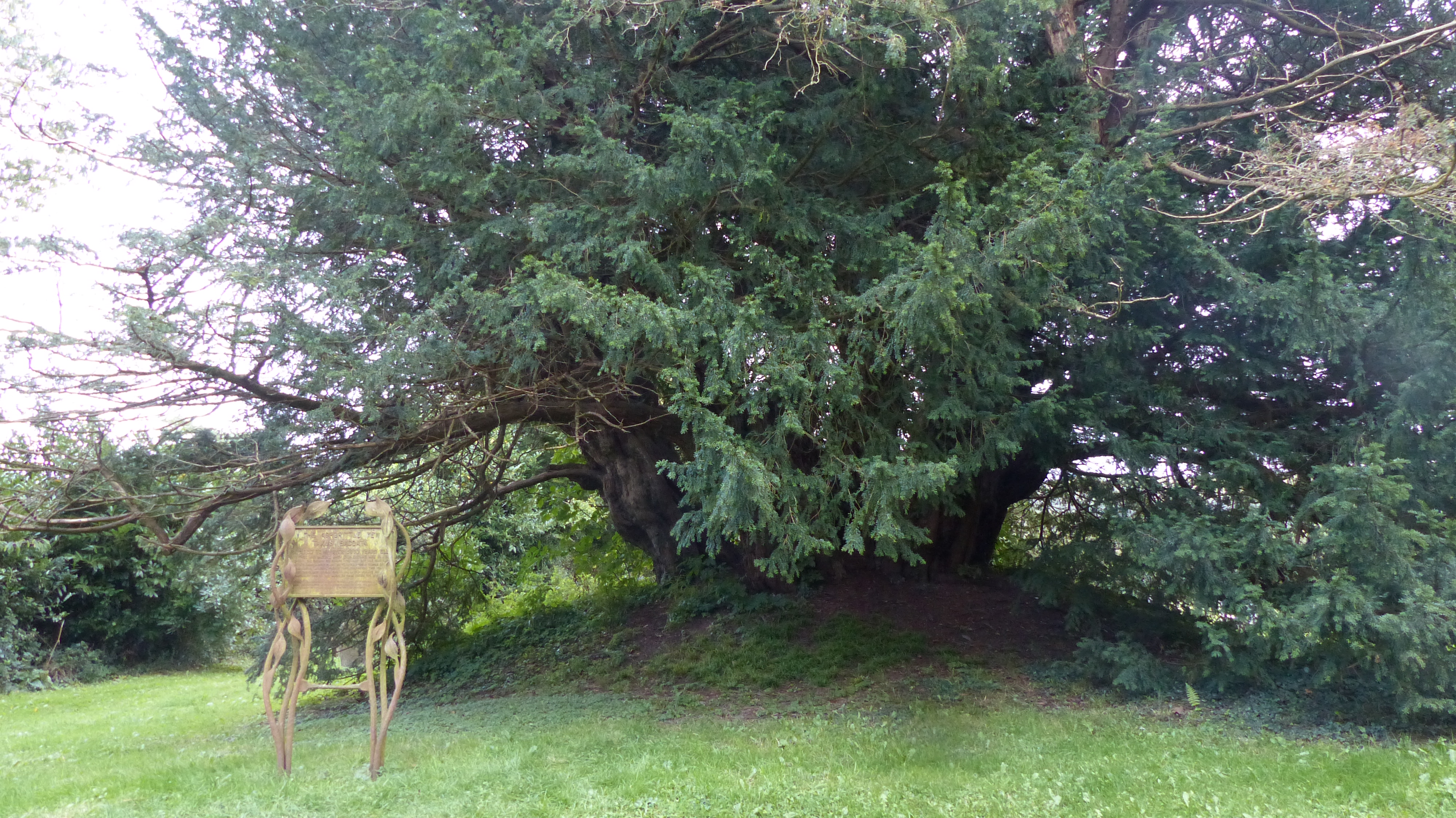
The Ashbrittle Yew and sign, September 2020

The Ashbrittle Yew is an ancient yew tree (Taxus baccata) located in the village of Ashbrittle, Somerset, in southwest England. The yew grows on a tumulus in the south-east end of the churchyard of St. John the Baptist. Yews are capable of living for several thousands of years; the Ashbrittle Yew itself is believed to be over 3,000 years old, but defining its precise age is difficult due to its hollow centre. The tree is formed of a hollow central trunk surrounded by six narrower boles. In 2015 its measured diameter was 39 ft 11 in (12.17 m).

In 2002 the Ashbrittle Yew was selected as one of '50 Great British Trees' chosen to commemorate the Golden Jubilee of Queen Elizabeth II. A carved sign stands beside the tree and bears the following information: The Ashbrittle Yew, Taxus Baccata, Reputed To Be Over 3000 Years Old. This tree was mature when Stonehenge was in use. Predating the church, its origin is obscure, but may have been intended to mark a holy place or remains from a nearby battle. Generations of local people have cherished this tree, one of the oldest living things in Britain. Please respect its antiquity and do not climb or walk inside the branches. The sign also contains several lines from the poem "Yew Trees" by William Wordsworth in 1813, commemorating two other ancient yews in Borrowdale and Lorton Vale: Of vast circumference and gloom profound / This solitary Tree! -a living thing / Produced too slowly ever to decay; / Of form and aspect too magnificent / To be destroyed.
