= Tortworth Chestnut =

Individual tree in South Gloucestershire

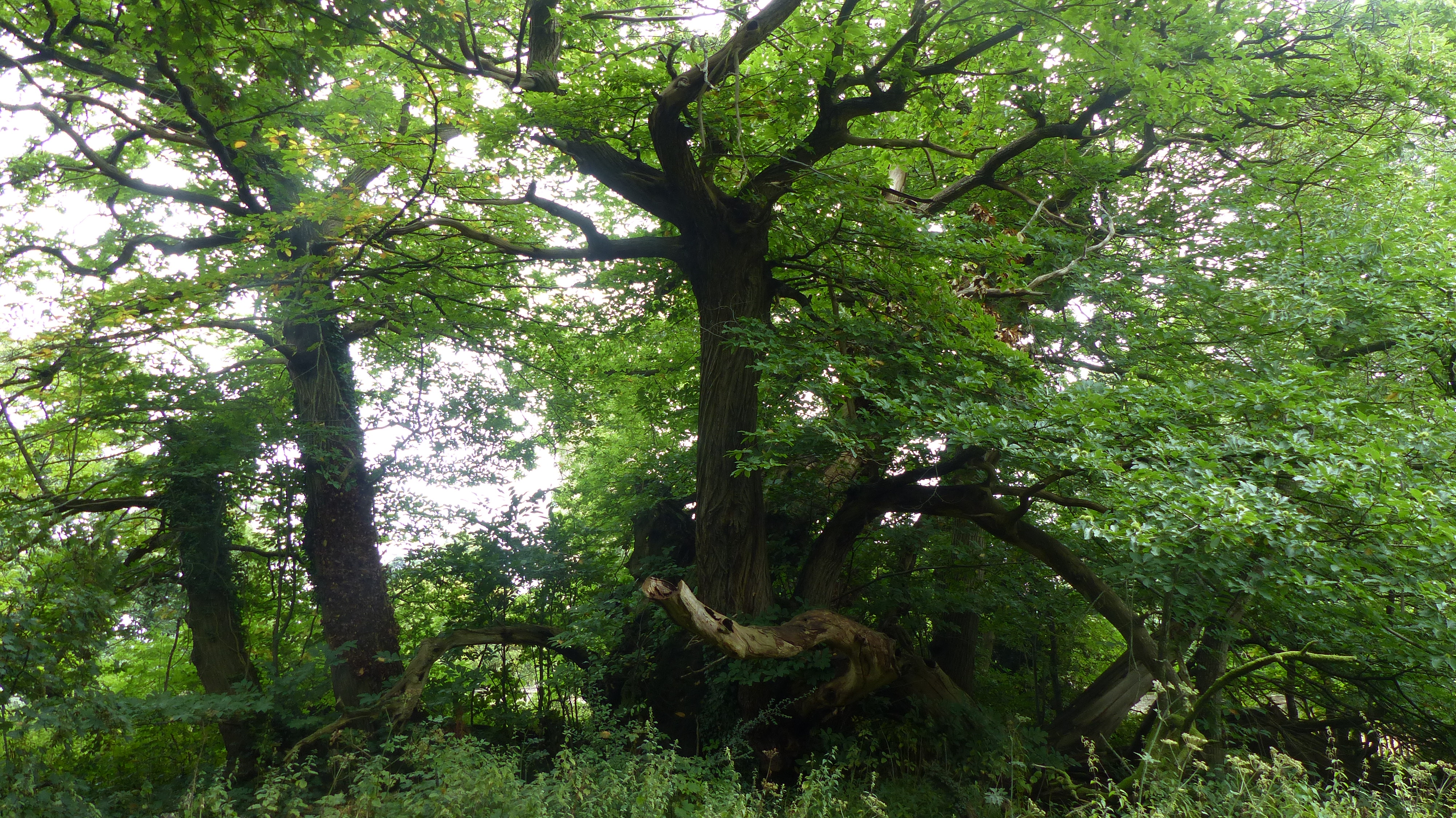
Tortworth Sweet Chestnut, August 2020

The Tortworth Chestnut is an ancient sweet chestnut (Castanea sativa) tree in Tortworth, South Gloucestershire. The exact age of the tree is unknown, but various sources provide estimates. Two accounts in 1664 and 1712 record the tree growing in, respectively, the 12th and 13th century, dating it at over 800 years old. The tree was known as "the Old Chestnut of Tortworth" in 1150, suggesting it is over 1,000 years old. More romantically, a legend recounts that the tree sprang from a nut planted in 800 AD during the reign of King Egbert.

The tree can be accessed via a lane next to the churchyard of St Leonard's in Tortworth. The original trunk has little live growth but over centuries new trunks have formed where branches have developed, subsided and re-rooted, and continued to flourish. This method of growth, and the space afforded by the estate in which to achieve it, has ensured the chestnut's longevity but hinders simple measurement of the tree's size. In 1791 the tree was measured at 44 feet (13 metres) at its widest part. More recently, its girth measured at a height of 1 metre was 11 metres in 1988, and 12 metres in 2013. The tree produced fruits as recently as 1788.

The tree is one of 50 Great British Trees across the United Kingdom that were selected by The Tree Council in 2002 to commemorate the Golden Jubilee of Elizabeth II.
