= Jedforest =

Historic forest in the Scottish Borders

Coordinates: 55.462°N 2.555°W

Jedforest is an historic forest in the Scottish Borders, that has been heavily wooded in the past. It is close to Jed Water and the town of Jedburgh, from which it takes its name.

The forest is home to the wide spreading Capon tree. It is an oak tree in Jedburgh near to another famous oak, 'King o' the Woods' and thought to be in excess of 500 years old. It has a girth of 17 feet, measured four feet from the ground.

== See also ==
- Jed-Forest Rugby Football Club
