= Glyntraian =

Community in Wrexham County Borough, Wales

Coordinates: 52.9292°N 3.1424°W

Glyntraian: Welsh: Glyntraean
- Community
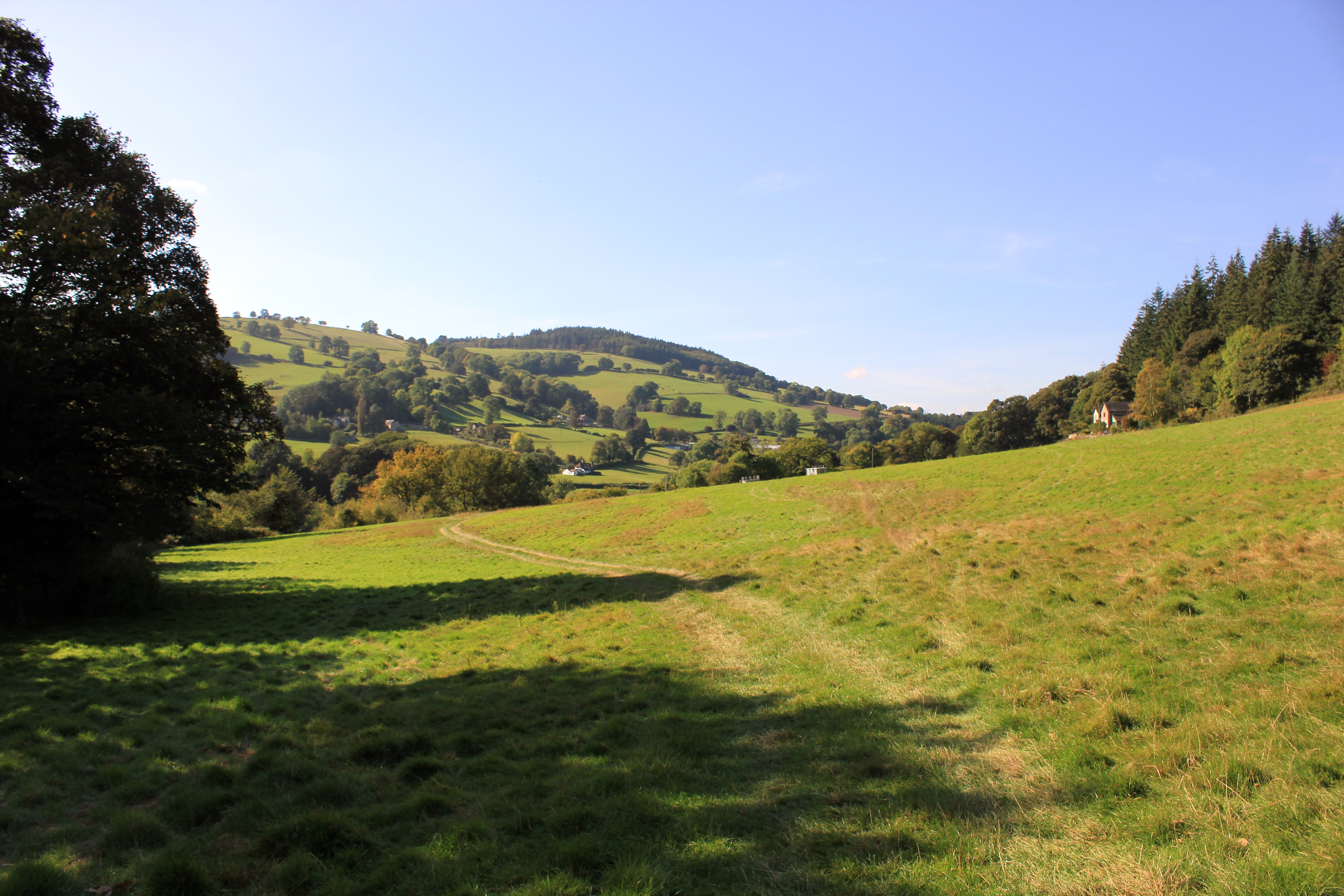
- View towards Glyntrian from Chirk Castle estate.
- Principal area: Wrexham
- Country: Wales
- Sovereign state: United Kingdom
- Ambulance: Welsh
- List of places UK Wales Map of the community

Glyntraian (Welsh: Glyntraean) is a community in Wrexham County Borough, Wales.

The parish of Glyntraian, lying at the mouth of the Ceiriog Valley, was formed when the ancient parish of Llangollen was divided into three traeanau ("traean/traian" being the Welsh for "third"): Llangollen Traean, Trefor Traean, and Glyn Traean - which became known as Glyntraian.

It contained the historic townships of Cilcochwyn, Crogeniddon, Crogenwladus, Erwallo, Hafodgynfor, Nantygwryd, Pennant and Talygarth.

Today, Glyntraian contains the villages of Dolywern, Llechrydau, Llwynmawr and Pontfadog; it is governed by Glyntraian Community Council (Welsh: Cyngor Cymuned Glyntraean), which replaced Glyntraian Parish Council under the Local Government Act 1972. At the 2001 Census, the community area had a total population of 878, falling to 822 at the 2011 Census.
