= Hethersett =

Village in Norfolk, England

Coordinates: 52°36′00″N 1°10′39″E

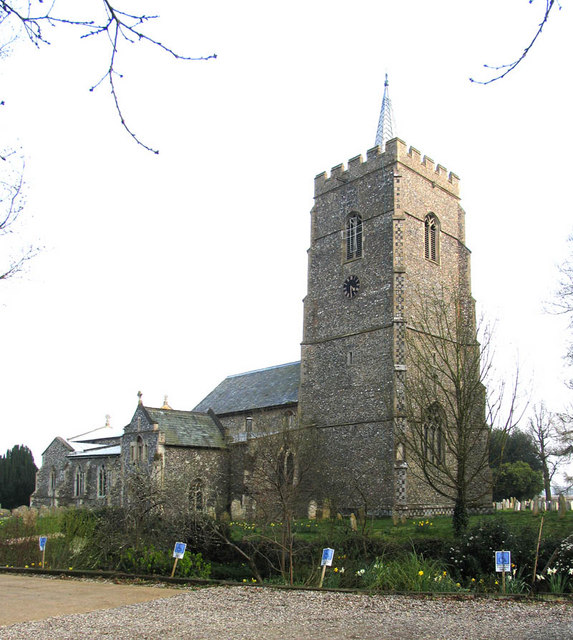
- St Remigius's Church, Hethersett

- Location within Norfolk
- Area: 10.9 km^{2} (4.2 sq mi)
- Population: 7,021 (2021)
  - Density: 644/km^{2} (1,670/sq mi)
- OS grid reference: TG157048
- Civil parish: Hethersett
- District: South Norfolk
- Shire county: Norfolk
- Region: East
- Country: England
- Sovereign state: United Kingdom
- Post town: NORWICH
- Postcode district: NR9
- Dialling code: 01603
- Police: Norfolk
- Fire: Norfolk
- Ambulance: East of England
- Website: hethersett.org.uk

Hethersett is a small village in Norfolk county, UK, with a population of 7,021 at the 2021 census. It covers an area of 2.489 km^{2}, with a population density of 3,163 per km^{2}. The village received the Big Society Award in 2013 for its "work in keeping the Olympic legacy alive."

== History ==
The village of Hethersett was recorded in the Doomsday Book, with a recorded population of 131 households in 1086. This makes it in the top 20% of settlements mentioned in the book. Hethersett also played a part in Kett's Rebellion of 1549, where Kett and his followers took down the hedges of a landowner, John Flowerdew. After this, they met at an oak known as Kett's Oak, and marched towards Norwich. The tree itself can still be seen today.

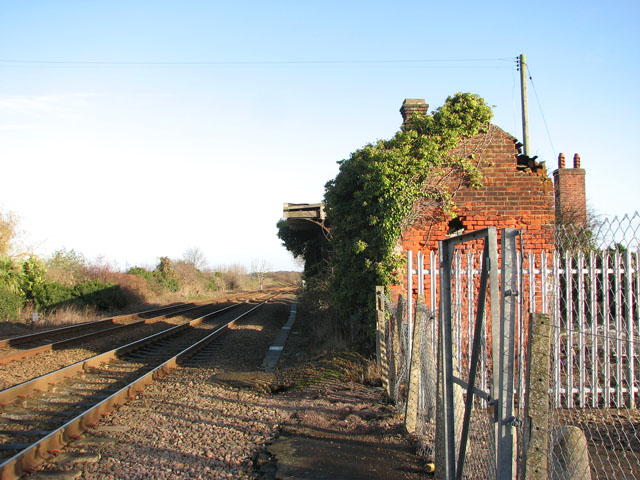
The now derelict Hethersett Station.

Later, the village got its own train station in July 1845, during a period of relative economic prosperity provided by the creation of more jobs in the village. However, the station was closed in 1966, and never continued service.

== Places of worship ==
Hethersett has four main places of worship: St Remigius, Hethersett Methodist Church, Hethersett Reformed Baptist Church, and the Hethersett Masjid and Islamic Community Centre.

=== St Remigius ===
St Remigius is an Angilican church, open during daylight hours for visitors, with a full choir. The current Rector is Revd Canon Damon Rogers. St Remigius Church itself is a medieval building with later Victorian additions. The church is mainly constructed of flint, with lead and slate roofs.

=== Hethersett Methodist Church ===
The Hethersett Methodist Church is part of the Norwich Circuit (14/1). The church includes a large library and holds communion once a month. The current church building was dedicated in 1983.

=== Hethersett Reformed Baptist Church ===
The Hethersett Reformed Baptist Church was founded in 1898, and is currently without a pastor.

=== Hethersett Masjid and Islamic Community Center ===
Serving Norwich and South Norfolk, the Hethersett Masjid and Community Center offers classes, a women's prayer area, and a Wudu area.

== War memorial ==
Hethersett War Memorial is a Portland stone cross in St. Remigius' Churchyard. The memorial was completed in 1920 and was funded by public subscription, being opened by Canon Pelham. The memorial lists the following names for the First World War:

| Rank | Name | Unit | Date of death | Burial/Commemoration |
|---|---|---|---|---|
| Cpl. | Arthur Hubbard | 7th Bn., Norfolk Regiment | 18 Sep. 1918 | Épehy Cemetery |
| LCpl. | George S. Livick | 9th Bn., Norfolk Regt. | 26 Sep. 1915 | Loos Memorial |
| AS | Ralph A. Buckingham | HMS Hampshire | 5 Jun. 1916 | Plymouth Naval Memorial |
| Pte. | Albert R. Childs | Army Service Corps | 2 Feb. 1920 | St. Remigius' Churchyard |
| Pte. | Harry H. Childs | 4th Bn., Cornwall Light Infantry | 17 Sep. 1917 | Deir al-Balah Cemetery |
| Pte. | Arthur C. Ninham | 9th Bn., Durham Light Infantry | 8 Nov. 1916 | Dernancourt Cemetery |
| Pte. | Robert J. Bartram | 11th Bn., Essex Regiment | 21 Apr. 1917 | Wimereux Cemetery |
| Pte. | Frederick Curson | 30th Bn., Royal Fusiliers | 17 May 1918 | St. Sever Cemetery |
| Pte. | Frederick Bennett | 71st Coy., Machine Gun Corps | 1 May 1917 | Loos Memorial |
| Pte. | George W. Moore | 4th Bn., Norfolk Regiment | 19 Apr. 1917 | Jerusalem Memorial |
| Pte. | Harry Sergent | 4th Bn., Norfolk Regt. | 19 Apr. 1917 | Gaza War Cemetery |
| Pte. | Arthur H. Shorten | 4th Bn., Norfolk Regt. | 3 Nov. 1917 | Gaza War Cemetery |
| Pte. | William Bishop | 5th Bn., Norfolk Regt. | 4 Nov. 1917 | North Gate War Cemetery |
| Pte. | Frederick J. Harvey | 2/8th Bn., Royal Scots | 8 Dec. 1918 | Abbeville Cemetery |
| Pte. | Benjamin G. Joy | 2nd Bn., Suffolk Regiment | 28 Mar. 1918 | Arras Memorial |
| Pte. | Frederick S. Blake | 7th Bn., Yorkshire Regiment | 14 May 1917 | Arras Memorial |
| Rfn. | William E. Bringloe | 12th (Rangers) Bn., London Regt. | 7 Oct. 1916 | Thiepval Memorial |
| St. | Horace Beaumont | M.F.A. Eleanor (Note: M.F.A. Eleanor was a mine-carrying fleet auxiliary ship which was sunk by the German submarine UB57 off the Isle of Wight. Stoker Beaumont was one of the 35 officers and crew killed that day.) | 12 Feb. 1918 | Chatham Naval Memorial |

The following names were added after the Second World War:

| Rank | Name | Unit | Date of death | Burial/Commemoration |
|---|---|---|---|---|
| Maj. | Raymond G. Coller | 3 Regt., Royal Artillery | 10 Dec. 1940 | St Remigius' Churchyard |
| Capt. | N. Beaumont-Thomas (Note: Captain Beaumont-Thomas was educated at Harrow School and Trinity College, Cambridge. Further information about his wartime service can be found on the Paradata Website.) | 4 (Para) Sqn., R.E | 20 Sep. 1944 | Oosterbeek War Cemetery |
| FO | Alan R. Colman | Air Transport Auxiliary | 17 Jan. 1943 | Lawnswood Cemetery |
| Lt. | John Gifford-Brown | Royal Army Service Corps | 19 Sep. 1940 | St. Remigius' Churchyard |
| PO | John McAnally | No. 214 Squadron RAF | 7 Jul. 1941 | As Cemetery |
| AS | Louis L. Bunn | HMS Charybdis | 23 Oct. 1943 | Saint Peter Port Cemetery |
| A1C | Frederick J. Boswell | Royal Air Force Reserve | 5 Jul. 1941 | Runnymede Memorial |
| Cftn. | Percy F. Huggins | R. Electrical Mechanical E. | 4 Jan. 1945 | Tell El Kebir Cemetery |
| Gnr. | Sydney A. Wreford | 65 AT Regt., Royal Artillery | 1 Jun. 1940 | Adinkerke Cemetery |
| Pte. | Henry R. Jeckells | 5th Bn., Royal Norfolk Regiment | 3 Mar. 1944 | Chungkai War Cemetery |
| Pte. | Fred Foster | 7th Bn., Royal Norfolks | 10 Jun. 1940 | Saint-Valery-en-Caux Cem. |
| Tpr. | Jack Weston | 52 Regt., Reconnaissance Corps | 18 Mar. 1945 | Reichswald War Cemetery |
| Slr. | Ernest Yull | S.S. Empire Mahseer (Note: S.S. Empire Mahseer was sunk by U-160 whilst part of an Atlantic Convoy between Fanara, Egypt and Baltimore. Sailor Yull was one of the 18 crew members killed.) | 3 Mar. 1943 | Tower Hill Memorial |

Furthermore, the following name was added after the Cyprus Emergency:

| Rank | Name | Unit | Date of death | Burial/Commemoration |
|---|---|---|---|---|
| Sgt. | Norman O. Folkard (Note: Sergeant Folkard was killed when the lorry he was travelling in plunged into a ravine whilst on the road to Halassa.) | 1st Bn., Royal Norfolk Regiment | 1 Sep. 1956 | Wayne's Keep Cemetery |
