= Pontfadog Oak =

Former sessile oak in Wrexham, Wales

Coordinates: 52°56′18″N 3°8′32″W

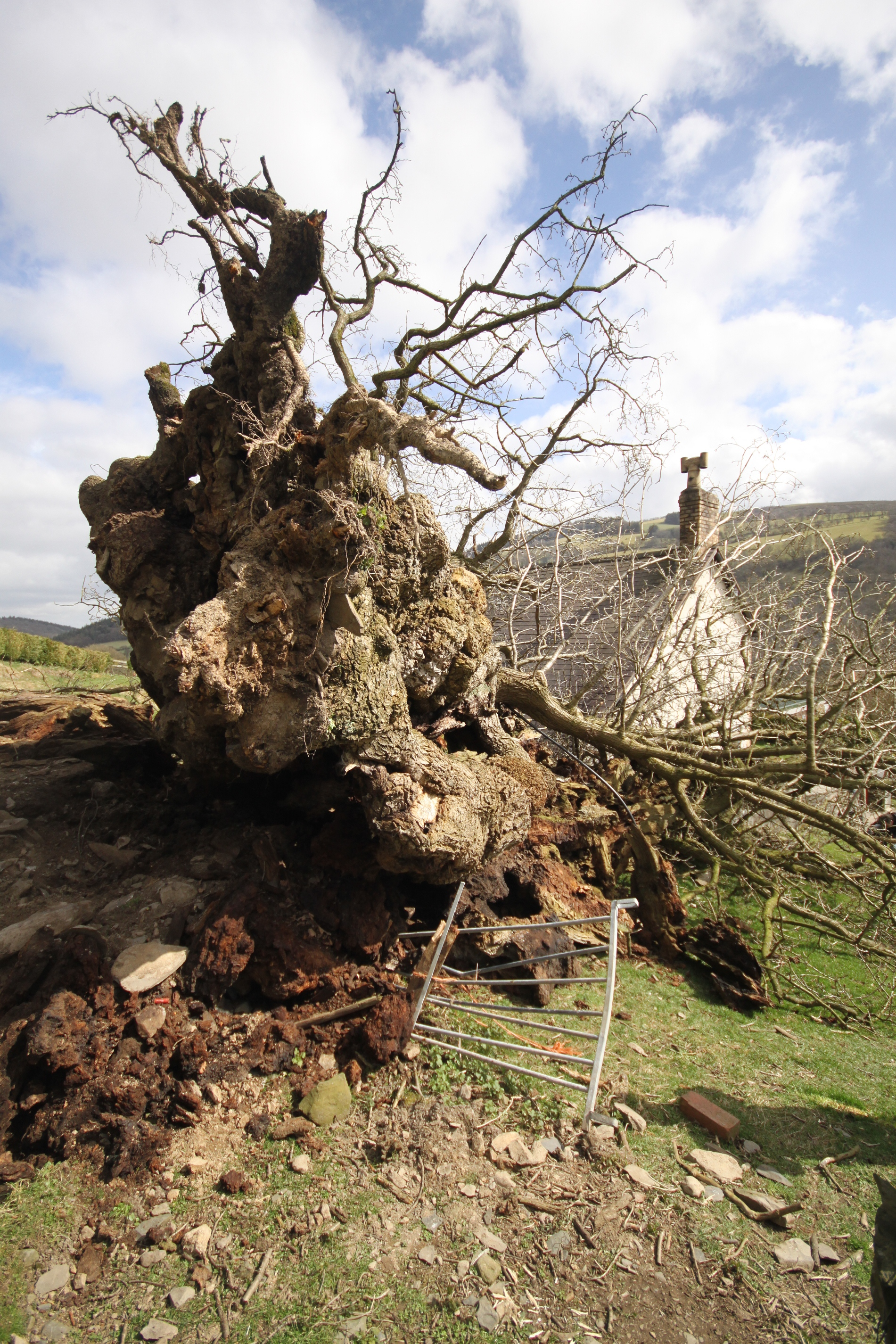
- The fallen tree
- Species: Sessile oak (Quercus petraea)
- Location: Pontfadog, Wrexham County Borough, Wales
- Date seeded: Between 368 and 815 AD
- Date felled: 18 April 2013

The Pontfadog Oak was a sessile oak tree (Quercus petraea) that stood on Cilcochwyn farm above the village of Pontfadog, in the Ceiriog Valley west of Chirk in the county borough of Wrexham, Wales, until it was blown over in the early hours of 18 April 2013. At the time it was reputed to be the oldest and largest oak tree in the United Kingdom.

Known as "Wales's national tree", its girth was over 16 metres (53 ft) in 1881.

In 1996 using Forestry Commission techniques, its age was estimated as between 1,181 and 1,628 years.

== Recognition ==
The oak was one of 50 Great British Trees selected by The Tree Council in 2002 to spotlight trees in Great Britain in honour of the Queen's Golden Jubilee, "in recognition of its place in the national heritage". (Note: Wording on plaque) It was one of just 74 trees described in the 2012 book Heritage Trees Wales, published in association with The Tree Council and with support from the Countryside Council for Wales and Forestry Commission Wales.

== Clones ==
In 2013, The Crown Estate propagated a sapling from the original tree and planted it in Windsor Great Park.

A further five saplings have been cloned from the Pontfadog Oak, three of which will be planted at the National Botanic Garden of Wales, with the other two going to sites near Pontfadog; one at Chirk Castle and the other at Erddig, as part of a woodland memorial to those who died during the COVID-19 pandemic.

== See also ==
- List of Great British Trees
