= Pontfadog =

Village in Wrexham County Borough, Wales

Coordinates: 52.935°N 3.140°W

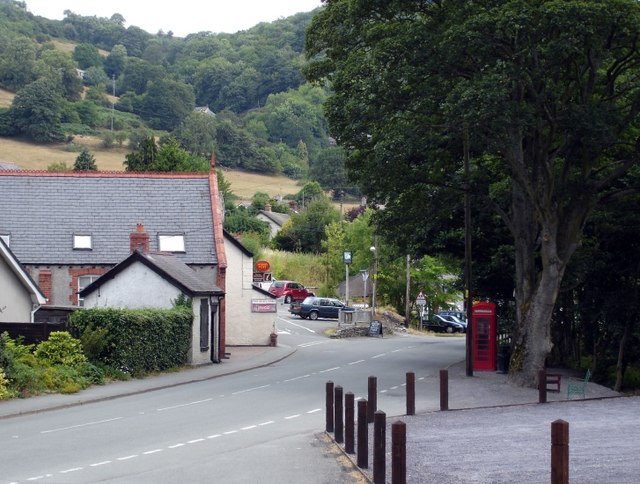
- Road into Pontfadog, showing former tramway waiting room (at left) and inn sign (centre)

- Location within Wrexham
- OS grid reference: SJ233381
- Community: Glyntraian
- Principal area: Wrexham
- Country: Wales
- Sovereign state: United Kingdom
- Post town: LLANGOLLEN
- Postcode district: LL20
- Dialling code: 01691
- Police: North Wales
- Fire: North Wales
- Ambulance: Welsh
- UK Parliament: Clwyd South
- Senedd Cymru – Welsh Parliament: Clwyd South

Pontfadog is a village in the Ceiriog Valley west of Chirk in Wrexham County Borough, Wales; it is part of the community of Glyntraian. Like the neighbouring village of Glyn Ceiriog, the growth of Pontfadog is connected to the area's former quarrying industry.

The village's name translates as "Bridge of Madoc", taking its name from a bridge over the River Ceiriog. Until April 2013, an oak tree stood near the village. Entitled the Pontfadog Oak, the tree reputed to be the oldest in the United Kingdom at the time; however, strong winds on the 17 April 2013 caused the tree to topple overnight.

The Glyn Valley Tramway had a station in the village, which has now been preserved by the Glyn Valley Tramway Group. In addition to the Swan Inn, the village's pub, there is also a village shop with a post office counter.
