= The Old Elm =

Centuries-old tree in Sliven, Bulgaria

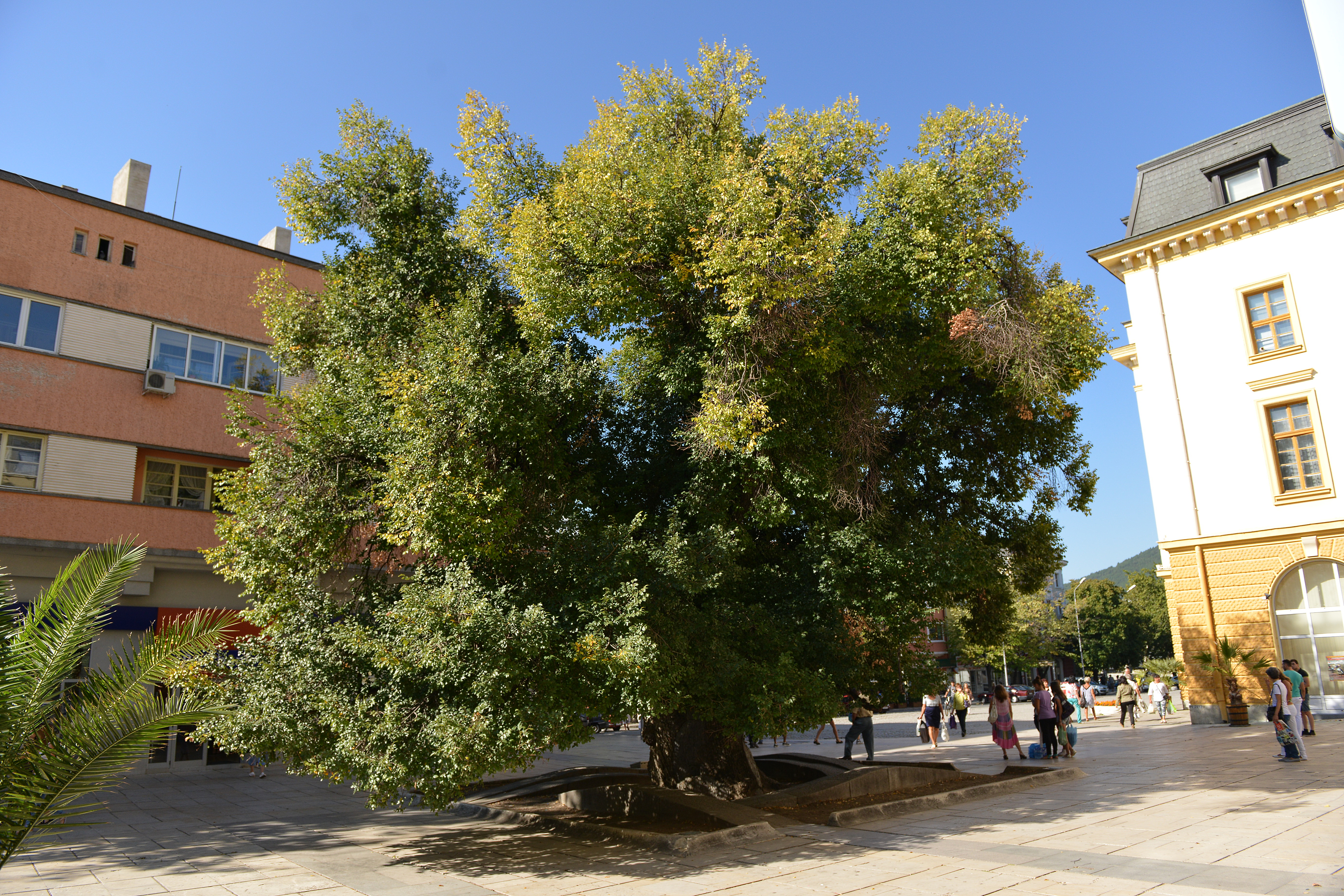
- The Old Elm in 2014
- Interactive map of The Old Elm
- Species: Ulmus minor
- Location: Sliven
- Coordinates: 42°40′50″N 26°19′01″E
- Height: 10 m (33 ft)
- Date seeded: c. 925

The Old Elm (Bulgarian: Старият бряст, Stariyat bryast) is a centuries-old tree of the species field elm that grows in the center of Sliven, Bulgaria. It is one of the symbols of the city. The tree has been declared a protected site which is guarded by the state. It represents a remnant from an ancient forest. In 2014, the tree started to show symptoms of the Dutch elm disease. The tree has been present in Sliven's coat of arms since 1995. The tree won the European Tree of the Year in 2014.

== Overview ==
The Old Elm is an ancient tree of the species field elm that grows in the center of Sliven, Bulgaria next to the city hall and at the start of the main pedestrian alley. It is one of the symbols of the city. The tree is approximately 1,100 years old and has a height of about 10 meters. The tree's perimeter is 5.75 metres (18.9 ft). The trunk circumference at its root is over 5.65 metres (18.5 ft). The trunk diameter at the roots is over 5 metres (16 ft) and 65 centimetres (0.65 m). The tree is designated as a protected site which is guarded by the Sliven Municipality. The tree is cared for by specialists from the University of Forestry. Continuous care for The Old Elm is a priority for the municipality.

== History ==
During the Middle Ages, the region around the central and western part of Sliven had not yet been settled and contained an ancient forest named the Great Bulgarian Forest. The Old Elm of Sliven is one of the last remaining trees of the forest, which historically stretched from the Rhodope Mountains to the Black Sea. The other surviving remnants of this forest consist of roughly twenty elm specimens near the village of Samuilovo, located approximately seven kilometers (4.3 mi) southeast of Sliven. Each of these trees has been officially recognized and protected as a natural landmark by the Bulgarian government. During the Ottoman rule in Bulgaria, the Old Elm reportedly served as a site for the execution of captured hajduci (rebel fighters) by the Ottoman Turks. According to the Bulgarian footballer Damyan Damyanov:

This tree is renowned; it is one of the city's symbols. A place of martyrdom and reverence, a monument to the rebellious defiance of the people of Sliven, the Old Elm is also a touching, tenacious representative of a vanishing species. While it is unknown whether the oppressor hanged our grandfather-heroes here centuries ago, the townspeople cherish this battle-scarred sage and care for it.

— Damyan Damyanov

== Disease and decline ==
In 2014, early signs of decline in the tree's health became apparent due to infection by Dutch elm disease, a fungal illness spread by bark beetles that obstructs the tree's vascular system, preventing water transport and leading to rapid dieback. Though at first, experts from the Bulgarian Academy of Sciences disputed the presence of the Dutch elm disease as the main cause of the declining health of the tree. In 2016, on behalf of Sliven Municipality, there was an expert evaluation of the health status of The Old Elm. The necessary rehabilitation measures were then determined and applied, including vaccination against the Dutch elm disease, strengthening the branches with "cobra" ropes, fertilizing the ground with nitrogen fertilizer, and installing dendrometers on the tree. By 2018, the disease had progressed significantly, and the tree's decayed central core and weakened structure necessitated a partial removal of its skeletal branches and much of its desiccated crown in a controlled sanitation cutting. Part of the tree's stem is cemented to preserve it and give it more stability. To slow the further spread of infection, sections of dead bark were also removed. Despite these measures, the tree's health deteriorated rapidly. In June of the same year, its mostly green crown turned yellow and dried out completely within several days. Because of this, there was a public debate on whether to replace the tree. In 2025, it was reported that the chances of The Old Elm surviving were becoming increasingly hopeful. According to Stefan Stefanov, it was because of two living branches, which are about 30 centimetres (0.30 m) above the ground and are 4 years old. He concluded that because the branches are alive, the roots must be alive as well.

== Cultural significance ==
The Old Elm is an important part of the cultural and social life in Sliven. In the past, the altitude of the city was measured under the tree. The people of Sliven regularly arrange meetings under the tree. Since 1995, the Old Elm has been present in the coat of arms of Sliven. In 2013, The Old Elm won the "Tree with Roots 2013" competition. In 2018, the Bulgarian National Bank issued a ten-leva silver commemorative coin "The Old Elm in Sliven" in a circulation of 3,000 pieces.

=== European Tree of the Year ===
In 2013, The Old Elm was nominated for the "European Tree of the Year" by the Municipality of Sliven and received active support from Sliven's citizens. In 2014, it was announced in Brussels that The Old Elm won the competition by 77,523 votes, more than twice the votes the second place entry "The Giant Pear of Gödöllő" in Hungary, which had 36,925 votes. Municipal officials credited the overwhelming outcome to an intense "get-out-the-vote campaign" organized by the youth of Sliven. In the same year, a postage stamp "The Old Elm – European Tree of the Year" was issued by "Bulgarian Posts".

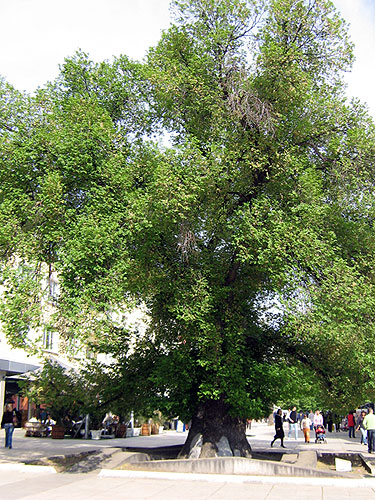
Another angle of The Old Elm, taken at 2006

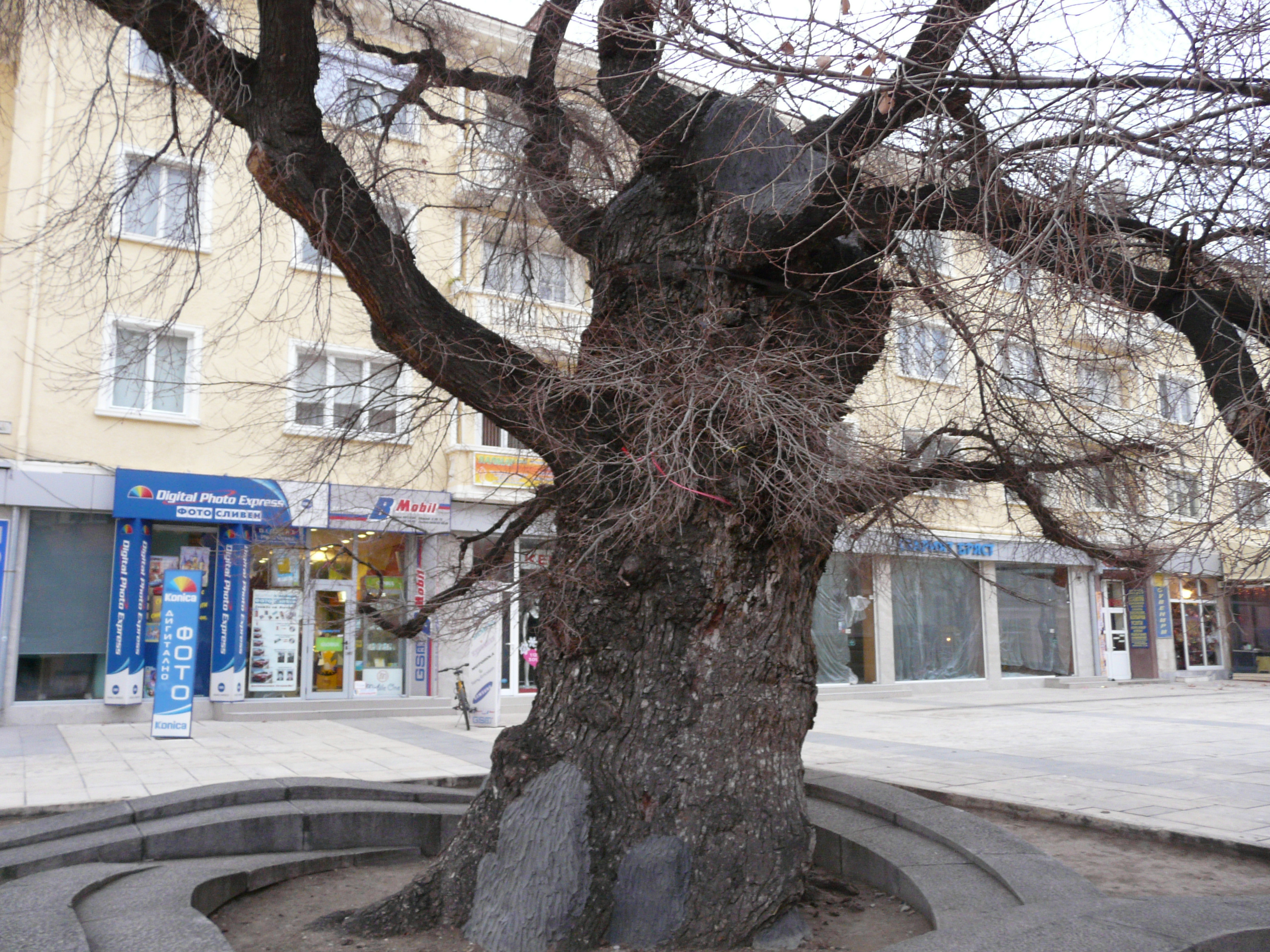
The Old Elm in 2019, showing signs of dying

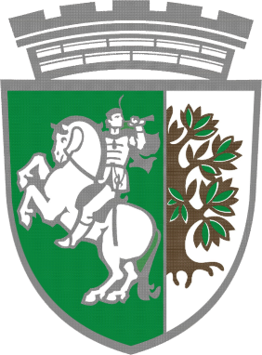
Coat of arms of Sliven since 1995, showing The Old Elm on the right

== See also ==
- List of individual trees
