= Sliven =

Sliven Сливен
- City
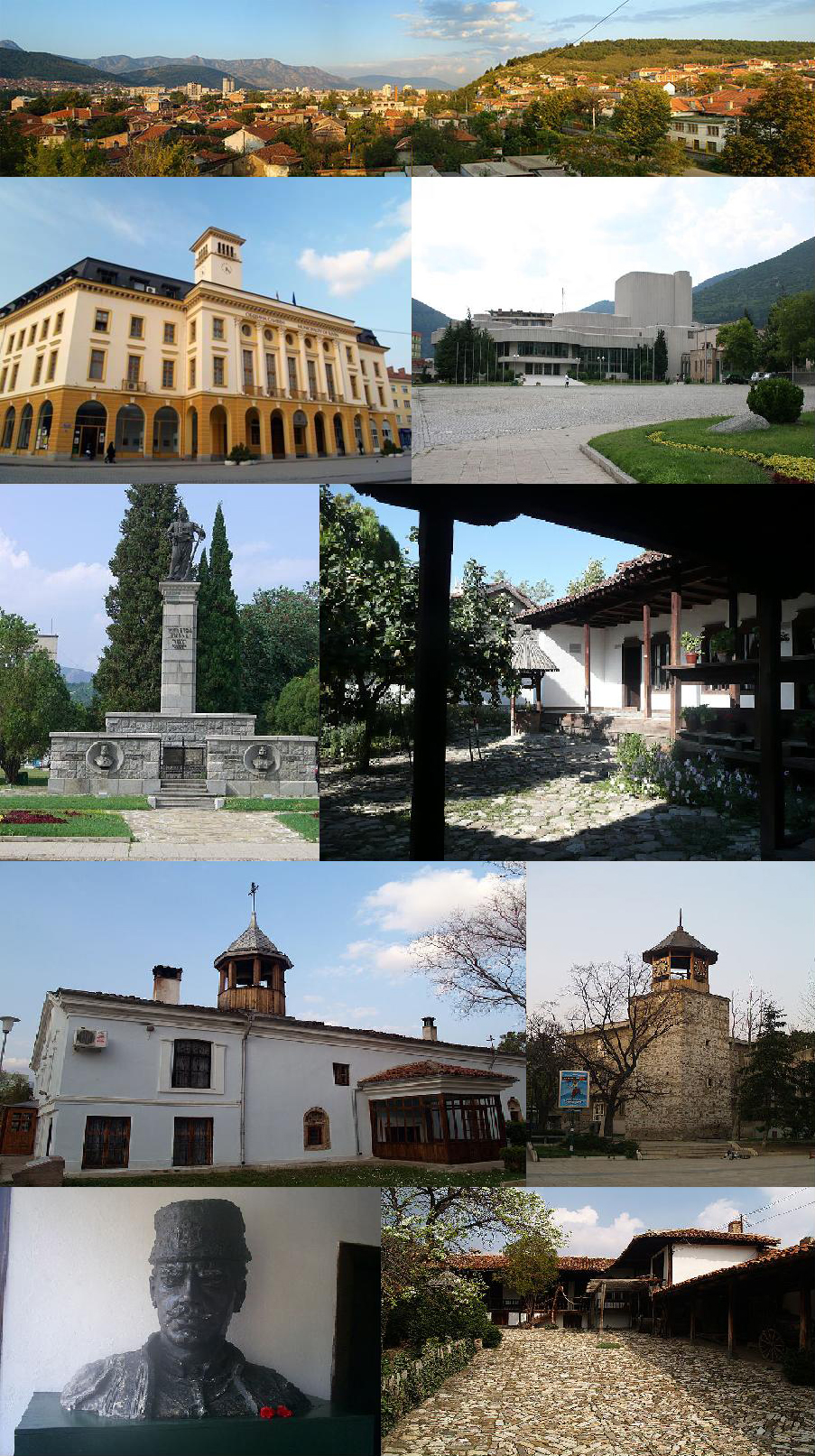
- Top: Panorama view of Sliven, 2nd left: Sliven City Hall, 2nd right: Stefan Kirov Drama Theater, 3rd left: Monument of Hadji Dimitar, 3rd right: Hadji Dimitar House Museum, 4th left: Saint Dimitar Cathedral, 4th right: Clock Tower, Bottom left: A bust chieftain of Hadji Dimitar in Dimitar House Museum, Bottom right: Slivenski Bit Museum

- Flag Coat of arms

- Location of Sliven Sliven (Balkans)
- Coordinates: 42°41′N 26°20′E
- Country: Bulgaria
- Province (Oblast): Sliven

Government
  - Mayor: Stefan Radev

Area
  - City: 193.78 km^{2} (74.82 sq mi)
- Elevation: 243 m (797 ft)

Population (Census 2021)
  - City: 83,740
  - Density: 432.1/km^{2} (1,119/sq mi)
  - Urban: 115,241
- Time zone: UTC+2 (EET)
  - Summer (DST): UTC+3 (EEST)
- Postal Code: 8800
- Area code: 044
- License plate: CH
- Website: Official website

Sliven (Bulgarian: Сливен [ˈslivɛn]) is the eighth-largest city in Bulgaria and the administrative and industrial centre of Sliven Province and municipality in Northern Thrace. It is situated in the Sliven Valley at the foothills of the Balkan Mountains.

Sliven is famous for its heroic haiduti who fought against the Ottoman Turks in the 19th century and is known as the "City of the 100 Voyvodi", a voyvoda being a leader of haiduti.

The famous rocky massif Sinite Kamani (Сините камъни, "The Blue Rocks") and the associated Sinite Kamani Nature Park, the fresh air and the mineral springs at Slivenski Mineralni Bani offer opportunities for leisure and tourism. Investors are exploring the opportunity to use the local wind (Bora) for the production of electricity.

Another point of interest and a major symbol of the city as featured on the coat of arms, is the more than 1,000-year-old Stariyat Briast (Старият Бряст, "The Old Elm"), a huge Smooth-leaved Elm in the center of the city. During Ottoman rule, Turkish officials used it to hang Bulgarian revolutionaries. Today the city is helping the tree to live on by frequent evaluations and reinforcing its base. It was elected Bulgarian tree of the year in 2013. On 19 March 2014 the results of an online poll were revealed at a ceremony in the European Parliament. The Old Elm was voted European Tree of the Year 2014. The city also served as an important strategic centre for the Bulgarian Army, with the headquarters of the Bulgarian Third Army located in the centre of the city, being situated relatively near to the sensitive Turkish border.

Sliven Peak on Livingston Island in the South Shetland Islands, Antarctica is named after Sliven.

== Etymology ==
The name comes from the Slavic word sliv ("pour, confluence") + the Slavic suffix or ending -en. In Turkish the name of the city is İslimiye, while in Greek it is Σήλυμνος (Sílymnos).

== Geography ==
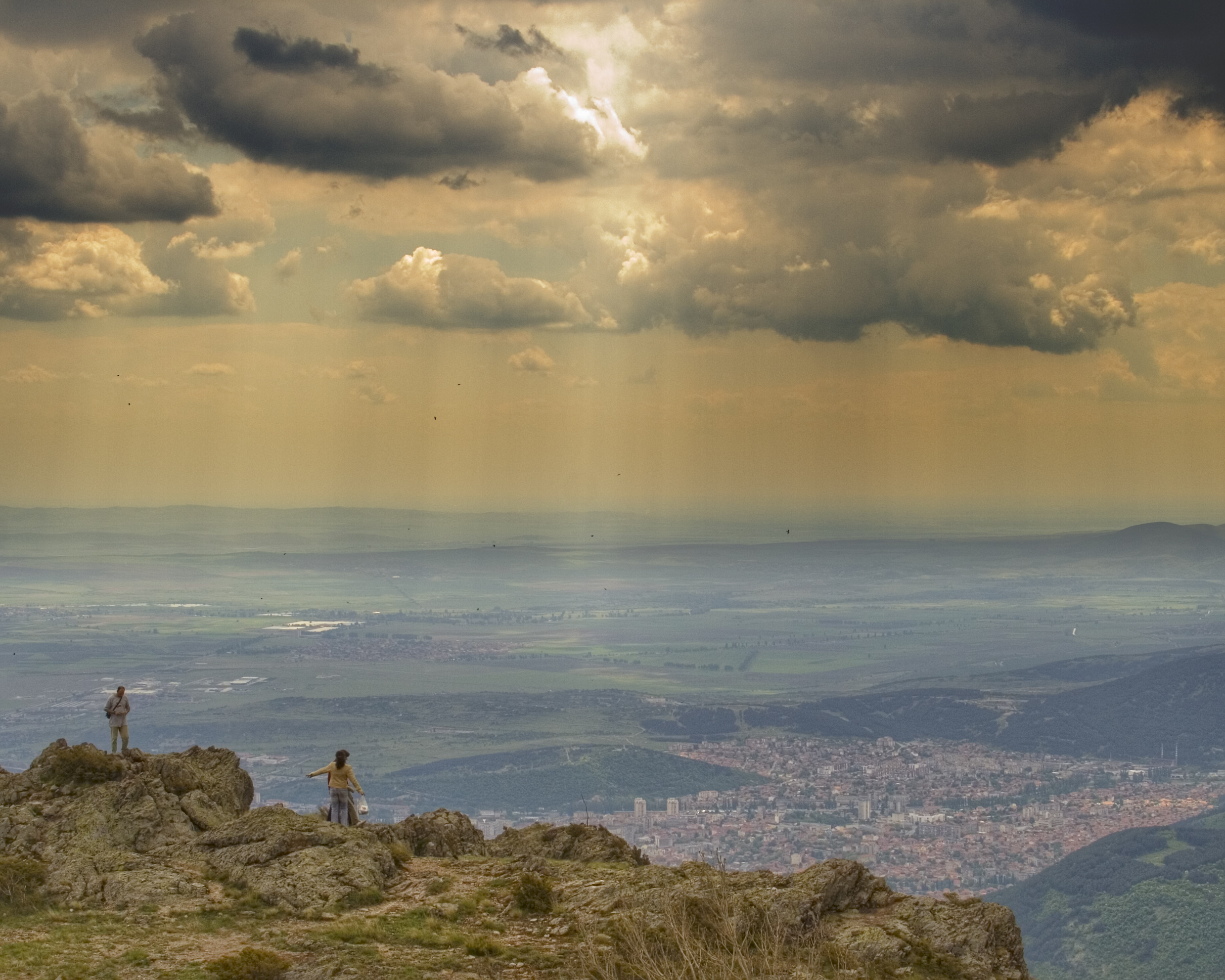
View of Sliven and the lowlands of Thrace from southern Stara Planina

Sliven is situated in the Sliven Valley at the foothills of the Balkan Mountains. It is located 300 km east of Bulgaria's capital Sofia, 100 km from Burgas, the country's largest commercial port, 130 km from the border with Turkey and 130 km from the border with Greece. It is located in close proximity to the cities of Yambol and Nova Zagora.

West of the city lies the so-called Peach Valley which contains large peach orchards. The city is also known for the mineral baths at Slivenski Mineralni Bani some 12 km southeast, whose water is used to treat diseases of the liver and nervous system.

The most visited geographical location and attraction in the city is the Karandila (Карандила). It is a hilltop 1050m above sea level, with great sights overlooking the city. The rock formation Halkata (Хaлката, "The Ring") is located on the Karandila. It is a rock protrusion with a peculiar hole in the center. According to myth, one would have their most sincere wish granted upon passing through the ring. Karandila is the site of the annual Karakachani festival, organized by the Federation of the Cultural and Educational Associations of Karakachans (ФКПДК) in Bulgaria each July.

Karandila is located in Sinite Kamani Nature Park, whose peak Bulgarka (1181 m) is the highest in the eastern Balkan Mountains.

=== Climate ===
Sliven Municipality is situated on the sub-Balkan plain in the zone of transitional-continental climate. In the region of Sliven, winter is mild and summer is relatively warm. Autumn is longer than spring. The local wind Bora is typical for the region.

Climate data for Sliven (1991–2020, extremes since 1991)
Month	Jan	Feb	Mar	Apr	May	Jun	Jul	Aug	Sep	Oct	Nov	Dec	Year
Record high °C (°F)	21.2 (70.2)	23.4 (74.1)	27.4 (81.3)	29.5 (85.1)	34.5 (94.1)	41.1 (106.0)	42.2 (108.0)	39.9 (103.8)	35.8 (96.4)	34.0 (93.2)	25.6 (78.1)	22.0 (71.6)	42.2 (108.0)
Mean daily maximum °C (°F)	6.1 (43.0)	8.5 (47.3)	12.6 (54.7)	17.9 (64.2)	23.1 (73.6)	27.5 (81.5)	30.1 (86.2)	30.5 (86.9)	25.4 (77.7)	19.1 (66.4)	12.7 (54.9)	7.4 (45.3)	18.4 (65.1)
Daily mean °C (°F)	2.1 (35.8)	3.8 (38.8)	7.3 (45.1)	12.1 (53.8)	17.3 (63.1)	21.7 (71.1)	24.3 (75.7)	24.2 (75.6)	19.2 (66.6)	13.6 (56.5)	8.3 (46.9)	3.5 (38.3)	13.1 (55.6)
Mean daily minimum °C (°F)	−1.1 (30.0)	0.1 (32.2)	3.2 (37.8)	7.3 (45.1)	12.1 (53.8)	16.4 (61.5)	18.6 (65.5)	18.6 (65.5)	14.3 (57.7)	9.7 (49.5)	4.9 (40.8)	0.4 (32.7)	8.7 (47.7)
Record low °C (°F)	−15.4 (4.3)	−13.5 (7.7)	−11.5 (11.3)	−2.5 (27.5)	1.9 (35.4)	4.6 (40.3)	10.0 (50.0)	9.4 (48.9)	5.6 (42.1)	−2.5 (27.5)	−6.7 (19.9)	−13.5 (7.7)	−15.4 (4.3)
Average precipitation mm (inches)	40 (1.6)	40 (1.6)	41 (1.6)	41 (1.6)	66 (2.6)	70 (2.8)	48 (1.9)	39 (1.5)	52 (2.0)	48 (1.9)	45 (1.8)	54 (2.1)	584 (23)
Average precipitation days (≥ 1.0 mm)	6	5	7	7	9	7	5	4	5	5	5	6	71
Average snowy days	5.9	4.5	3.2	0.1	0	0	0	0	0	0	1	3.7	18.4
Mean monthly sunshine hours	104	125	166	205	257	292	330	322	244	177	117	95	2,434
Source: NOAA NCEI, Meteomanz(extremes since 2021, snowy days 2000-2020)

Climate data for Sliven (2002–2013)
Month	Jan	Feb	Mar	Apr	May	Jun	Jul	Aug	Sep	Oct	Nov	Dec	Year
Mean daily maximum °C (°F)	6.7 (44.1)	8.5 (47.3)	13.0 (55.4)	18.5 (65.3)	24.0 (75.2)	28.1 (82.6)	30.8 (87.4)	31.3 (88.3)	26.1 (79.0)	19.5 (67.1)	13.6 (56.5)	7.7 (45.9)	19.0 (66.2)
Daily mean °C (°F)	2.3 (36.1)	3.5 (38.3)	8.2 (46.8)	13.4 (56.1)	18.7 (65.7)	23.2 (73.8)	25.2 (77.4)	25.6 (78.1)	20.9 (69.6)	14.7 (58.5)	9.6 (49.3)	3.7 (38.7)	14.3 (57.7)
Mean daily minimum °C (°F)	−0.5 (31.1)	0.6 (33.1)	3.5 (38.3)	8.7 (47.7)	12.7 (54.9)	17.0 (62.6)	19.0 (66.2)	19.2 (66.6)	15.0 (59.0)	10.2 (50.4)	5.6 (42.1)	1.1 (34.0)	9.3 (48.7)
Average precipitation mm (inches)	46 (1.8)	41 (1.6)	31 (1.2)	50 (2.0)	67 (2.6)	66 (2.6)	54 (2.1)	37 (1.5)	32 (1.3)	43 (1.7)	61 (2.4)	59 (2.3)	587 (23.1)
Mean monthly sunshine hours	94	122	171	213	264	293	327	319	232	191	123	87	2,441
Source: weather.com

== Demographics ==
According to the Bulgarian National Statistical Institute, as of 2021, the total population of the Sliven Municipality is 115,241 inhabitants while 83,740 inhabitants live in the city of Sliven. The town is called the under-age mother capital of Europe, with 177 such births in 2008.

Historical population
Year	Pop.	±%
1887	20,893	—
1910	25,142	+20.3%
1934	30,571	+21.6%
1946	34,291	+12.2%
1956	46,175	+34.7%
1965	68,384	+48.1%
1975	90,187	+31.9%
1985	102,423	+13.6%
1992	106,212	+3.7%
2001	100,366	−5.5%
2011	91,620	−8.7%
2021	83,371	−9.0%
2022	82,251	−1.3%
Source: Censuses"National statistical institute". 2024-10-31.

=== Ethnic groups ===
Members of the following ethnic groups are represented in the city's population:

- Bulgarians: 68,853 (87.1%)
- Roma: 5,666 (7.2%)
- Turks: 2,637 (3.3%)
- Greeks (Sarakatsani), Armenians and others: 1,388 (1.8%)
- Undefinable: 491 (0.6%)
  - Undeclared: 12,585 (13.7%)

Total: 91,620

In Sliven Municipality, 88,750 declared as Bulgarians, 12,153 as Roma, 4,209 as Turks, and 18,641 did not declare their ethnic group. The city of Sliven, Sliven Municipality and Sliven Province have the largest number of Roma in Bulgaria.

== History ==
=== Antiquity ===
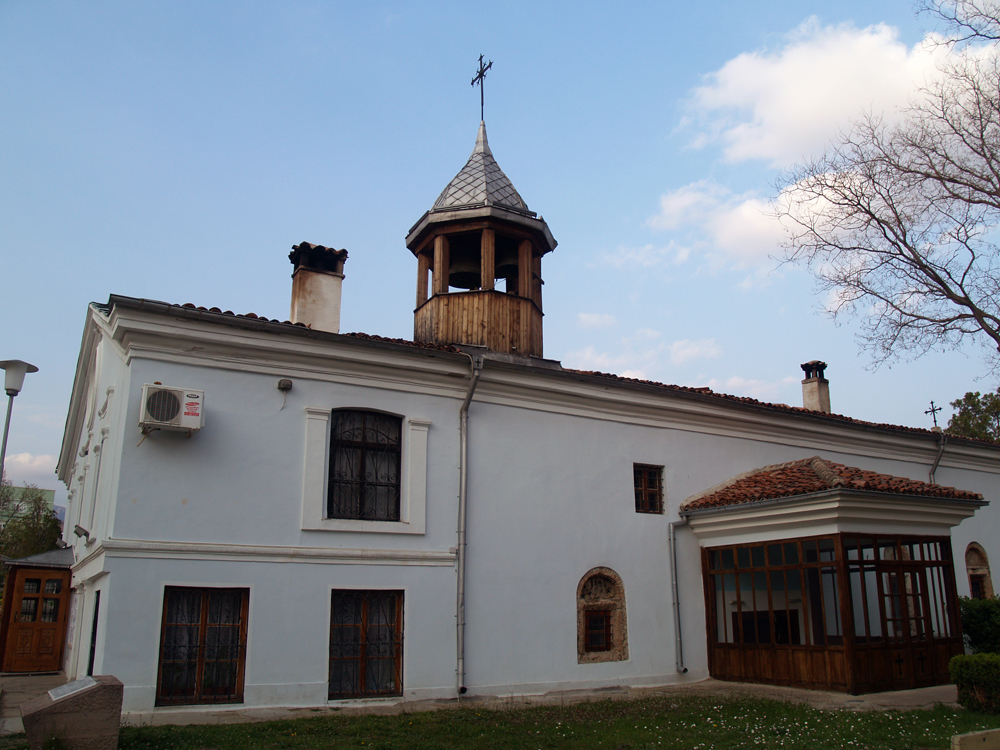
Saint Demetrius church in Sliven, built 1831

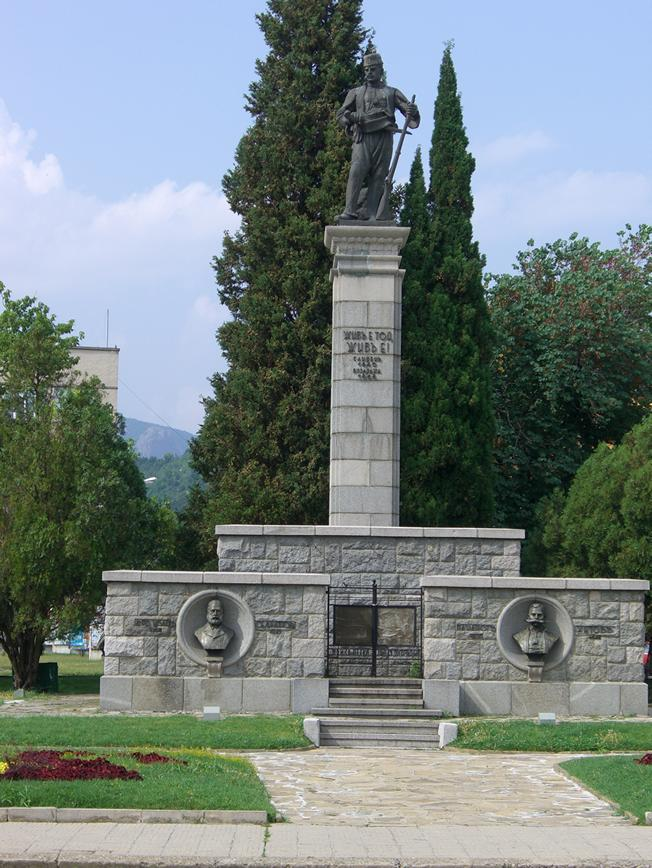
The monument of Hadzhi Dimitar in Sliven

Remains of the oldest settlements on the territory of Sliven date back to around 6000 BCE of the Neolithic. Ruins of a Thracian settlement dating to around 5th–3rd century BCE as well as Thracian ceramics and Hellenistic coins have been discovered in the area of Hisarlaka — a small hill in Sliven. In antiquity it was known as Selymnos (Σήλυμνος in Greek). The area occupied by present-day Sliven has in the past been settled by the Thracian tribes Asti, Kabileti and Seleti. These tribes held their independence until time of Philip II of Macedon and Alexander the Great who conquered them.

The 2nd century BCE marked the beginning of the Roman conquests of northeastern Thracia. Sliven was conquered by Rome around 72–71 BCE when the Thracian Kabile and later Greek cities of Kabile and Apolonia are conquered. With the emergence of the Roman Empire the region of the city became part of the Thracian province of the Roman Empire.

A new stage in the city's history began around 2nd-4th century. The first written records of the settlement's name, Tuida/Suida/Tsuida date to this period. This name is most likely of Thracian origin. Its etymology is currently not understood. It is also mentioned by Hierocles, who identifies it as one of the four cities in the province of Haemimontus, established as part of the Diocese of Thrace under Diocletian and also by Procopius of Caesarea. The Roman road from Anchialos (today Pomorie) along the Tundzha to Serdika was built.

In a written record from the 3rd century, the settlement was called ''Tarzhishte" and most likely belonged to the territory of the city of Augusta Traiana (today Stara Zagora).

The fortress avoided the Gothic War, but was destroyed in the Huns' raid in the 5th century. During the reign of Emperor Anastasius I Dicorus, it was rebuilt, which retained the previous one's plan, but was considerably fortified.

In the ancient fortress' interior and near its eastern wall, are excavated the remains of a basilica with a baptistery, which functioned in the 5th-6th centuries. It was likely destroyed by the Huns and rebuilt under Justinian I. A larger church was founded in the south of the fortress, built in the 5th century and enlarged in the 6th century. This indicates that the settlement was not limited to the territory of the fortress, but also expanded in the surrounding area.

The city of Tuida/Tsuida was the seat of a bishop, subordinate to the Metropolitanate of Adrianople. Until that time the bishop seat was in Cabyle. In the 4th century, most likely due to the proximity of the two cities, which were in different provinces, Cabyle was abandoned and its population moved to Diospolis. The seat of the bishop, however, for unknown reasons, was moved to Tuida, which very likely marked the beginning of the proverbial rivalry between Sliven and Yambol.

Tuida ceased to exist around 598-599, when it was again destroyed, most likely by the Avars and Slavs. There is a theory that this happened as part of a major battle between the Avars and the Byzantine general Comentius.

=== Middle Ages ===
The area of Sliven was incorporated into the First Bulgarian Empire around 705 as part of the Slav-settled Zagore, according to Tervel's treaty with the Byzantine Emperor Justinian II. A settlement was established on the area of Tuida, of which the etymology is unknown. The beginnings of the settlement weren't dated, but were before 870, when a lead seal of Boris I was discovered. The Bulgarians reconstructed the walls of the fortress and also the water supply at the northern gate. New buildings were built, some of which, have lined marble slabs made in Preslav's stonemasonry workshops.

Paleoornithologist Zlatozar Boev discovered bone remains of 14 species of wild and domestic birds in Hissarlaka from the 10th-12th centuries. The findings of Hawk eagle (Aquila fasciata) and grouse (Tetrao urogallus) are among the rarest in the country.

The town continued to exist after the dissolution of the first empire. The Pechenegs briefly controlled it in mid-10th century, after which it began to decline. In 1153, the town was rebuilt. The fortress was abandoned and ceased.

During the Second Bulgarian Empire, twenty-four monasteries were built in its vicinity, which formed a complex. Under Tsar Ivan Alexander, Sliven was a town near the Byzantine Empire. During the Ottoman invasion of Bulgaria, the medieval town was destroyed and the monasteries were burnt. The city was known as "İslimye" by the Turks.

=== Early modern history ===
During Ottoman rule Sliven was a sanjak centre in first Rumelia eyalet, then Silistre (Özi) eyalet, Edirne vilayet. From the beginning of the 16th century it was the centre of a kaza, which retained its territory until the middle of the 19th century. In the 17th century Sliven developed as a crafts centre and also famous for the production of guns, pickaxes, iron tools. The town was the settlement of a strong Hajduk movement against the Ottomans and became known as "the town of the hundred voivodes". Among them were Hadzhi Dimitar, Zlati Voivoda and Panayot Hitov. As the chief priest of the Bulgarian Militia, Amphilohiy from Sliven consecrated the Samara flag in Ploiești. Sliven was also as a Jewish center. By 1859, 30 Jewish families lived in Sliven, where a synagogue and a Jewish school were built for them.

In 1738, the population of Sliven was predominantly Turkish. In a register from 1792, Sliven Sanjak is mentioned for the first time. Many Sliven residents participated in the Greek War of Independence. Hadzi Hristo was made a general and took the lead of the troops of Bulgarians, Albanians and Greeks, and was later elected to the Greek parliament. The inhabitants of the town also supported the Brăila revolt, Crimean War and participated in the Second Bulgarian Legion.

During the Russo-Turkish War of 1828-1829, the troops of General Hans Karl von Diebitsch entered Sliven. Continuous massacres of the Muslim population and desecration of mosques were made, involving both Bulgarian and Russian soldiers and local residents. The first Russian consulate was opened here in April 1830. After the withdrawal of the Russian troops, more than 15,000 people from the town and surrounding villages were displaced to southern Russia, Bessarabia and Wallachia, while only 2,000-3,000 Bulgarians remained in the town. With this, Sliven suffered a severe demographic and economic blow, which blunted the momentum of its former development.

During the Bulgarian National Revival, Sliven emerged as an important trade, craft and cultural centre. The town was divided into residential, commercial and craft and administrative parts. Through the efforts of Dobri Chintulov and other Sliven notables, the Zora Community Centre was founded in 1860. The founder of the Bulgarian theatrical work was the Sliven-born public and cultural worker Sava Dobroplodni, who wrote the first play in Bulgarian history - "Mihal Mishkoed". In 1843, the first textile industrial enterprise in the Ottoman Empire was established in Sliven, with Dobri Zhelyazkov as its head. In 1864 a second one was opened, and in 1872 tobacco and spirit factories were established.

The inhabitants of Sliven became actively involved in the national church struggle. In 1859, the people of Sliven expelled the Greek bishop, and the Diocese of Sliven entered the borders of the Bulgarian Exarchate established on 28 February 1870. The first spiritual leader of the diocese was Metropolitan Seraphim of Sliven.

During the April Uprising, Sliven was the centre of the Second Revolutionary District. Battles were fought near the town during the Russo-Turkish Liberation War of 1877-1878 which in return burnt 800 shops and 100 houses in the town centre. Metropolitan Seraphim is particularly credited with saving Sliven and a number of settlements and chifliks in the region from complete destruction. Sliven was liberated by Russian troops on 16 January 1878.

In the 19th century, the town was a district centre and was one of the largest towns in Bulgaria with a population of over 20,000. The majority were Bulgarians. For a short period a centre of a department in the autonomous province of Eastern Rumelia before its inclusion in the Principality of Bulgaria in 1885.

=== Modern history ===
At the municipal elections in September 1911, the Bulgarian Social Democratic Workers Party won the most seats, but failed to take over the municipality until August 1912, when Dr. Yordan Danchev was elected mayor. The party won elections again in 1915 and 1919. A welfare bureau, a labor bureau, and municipal housing for the homeless were established. Binding regulations were issued on relations between workers and employers on wages, on weekends and holidays. The administration was dissolved on 31 January 1923 by a decision of the BZNS-dominated Sliven District Court.

During the First World War it was the site of the Sliven prisoner of war camp, the largest such camp in the country. It was the place of internment for Greek and Serbian civilians and soldiers, with peak numbers of 19,000.

From the beginning of the Industrial Revolution in Bulgaria in the late 19th century until the beginning of the socialist economy in 1945, the industry was concentrated in the northern parts of the city. The new Socialist government gradually began to consolidate the existing factories and built new ones, with industry concentrating around the newly built station. At some point the industrial workforce numbered 20,000, 1/2 of whom were in textile production - wool and cotton textiles. The second most important is the food industry and the third is the machine building industry (ZMM - Sliven, Dinamo Plant, etc.).

As one of the most significant cultural centres during the Bulgarian National Revival, with much of its old heritage still preserved and enriched, modern Sliven offers to its citizens and visitors a lot of opportunities for cultural life. It served as the birthplace of many prominent Bulgarians, including Hadzhi Dimitar, Dobri Chintulov, Ivan Seliminski. Another notable native is Anton Pann who composed the Romanian national anthem. Another notable resident is Yordan Letchkov, whose goal in the 1994 World Cup eliminated defending champion Germany. Letchkov was mayor of Sliven from 2003 to 2011.

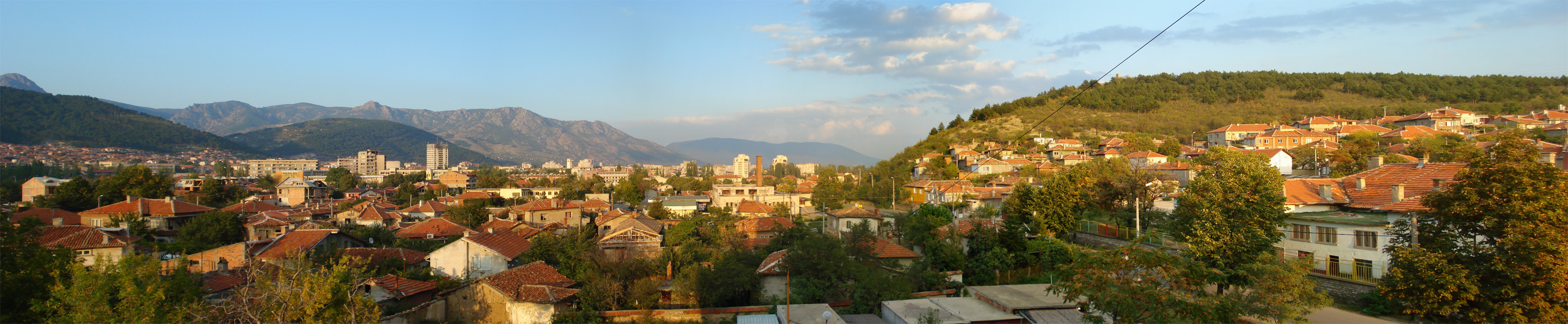

== Politics ==
Mayors from Bulgarian Socialist Party have been in charge of Sliven Municipality in the period 1990–1991, 1999–2003 and 2011–2015. For his second term (2007–2011), Yordan Letchkov was nominated by GERB. Since 2015, Stefan Radev is the mayor of Sliven Municipality. In the local elections in 2011 and 2019, he was nominated by GERB (he won in 2019). Hristin Petkov was mayor of the SDS from 1991 to 1995.

In the 2011 local elections, the BSP candidate (and non-member of the party) General Kolyo Milev won in the second round with 52.94% of the votes counted against the GERB candidate (also non-member) Yordan Letchkov.

Since 2015, the mayor of Sliven has been Stefan Radev, nominated by PP GERB (2015 and 2019), re-elected with 64.75% in the second round of local elections in 2019. On 11 November 2019, he officially took office.

== Economy ==
The economy of Sliven has centered around industry since the early 19th century. In 1834, Dobri Zhelyazkov established the first factory in Bulgarian lands, thus starting industrial development in Bulgaria. Sliven was one of the largest industrial centers in Bulgaria, playing an important role during the Bulgarian National Revival. It has long-lived traditions in textiles, machine-building, glass-making, chemical production, and the technical and food industries.

Following the beginning of communist rule in Bulgaria in 1944, most industries were nationalized and much industrial building and development was spurred. Industry continued to develop until the fall of communism, at which point much of the previously built industry stagnated; many plants and factories were shut down and there was little development.

In contemporary times, Sliven has experienced a surge in economy with increased investment, banking establishments and new industries have begun to emerge. The dairy industry, which has long been present, continues to grow and thrive. The wine industry, with companies such as Vinprom and Vini Sliven and about a dozen others, continues to grow as grapes are easily grown due to the climate conditions. In terms of heavy industry, the city produces electric lights and electrical machines. The city has also become notorious as a source of young girls who are trafficked into the sex industry.

Light industry in Sliven is mostly devoted to textiles with many companies making wool clothing, socks, and food.

In 2024, it was reported that a gang based in Sliven had been receiving up to £200 million annually in fraudulent welfare payments from the British government.

== Transportation ==
There is a military airport in the town, the Sliven Airfield.

The city has a trolleybus system which opened in 1986.

== Culture ==
Drama Theatre ''Stefan Kirov''

=== Theatres ===
When the first theatre stage was opened, theatre traditions began in Sliven 140 years ago. In 1918 the first professional theatre troupe was established in the community centre "Zora". At present the Stefan Kirov Drama Theatre is a state theatre. The new building of the theatre was built in 1986 and has a large hall (484 seats), a chamber hall (121 seats), a ballet hall, a spacious lobby on two levels with a bar for spectators, an administrative part. In 2008 the theatre celebrated its 90th anniversary.

The State Puppet Theatre – Sliven was established in 1961 (then an amateur theatre, since 1971 a state theatre), it is located in the renovated in the 1980s building of the former cinema "Balkan".

=== Museums ===
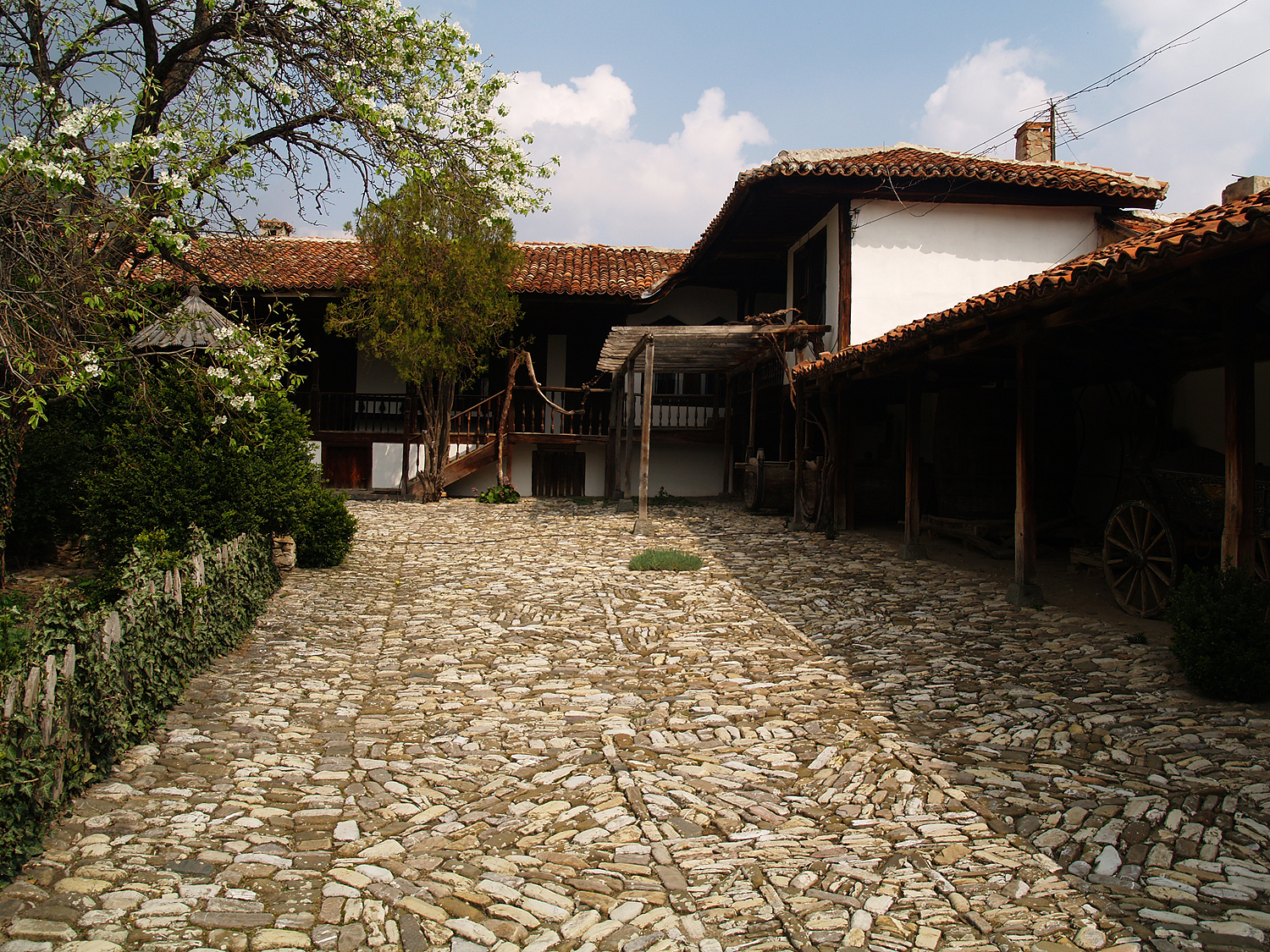
The house museum of the Sliven lifestyle

- Simeon Tabakov Regional History Museum
- Hadzhi Dimitar House Museum
- National Museum of Textile Industry
- Dobri Chintulov House Museum
- The House Museum of 19th Century Sliven Urban Life

=== The Old Elm ===
The Old Elm which grows in the city center, is a tree of the species of field elm (Ulmus glabra), and is about 1300 years old, it is declared a protected site. It is a remnant of the Great Bulgarian Forest, which stretched from the Rhodope Mountains to the Black Sea. About 20 such elms remain in the village of Samuilovo, 7 km from Sliven. All of them have been declared protected sites. The cavities are filled with reinforcing filler and have been left openings for natural ventilation to stop rotting processes or breedings of microorganisms. The tree was used by the Ottoman Turks to hang captured hajduk.

=== Fortress Tuida ===
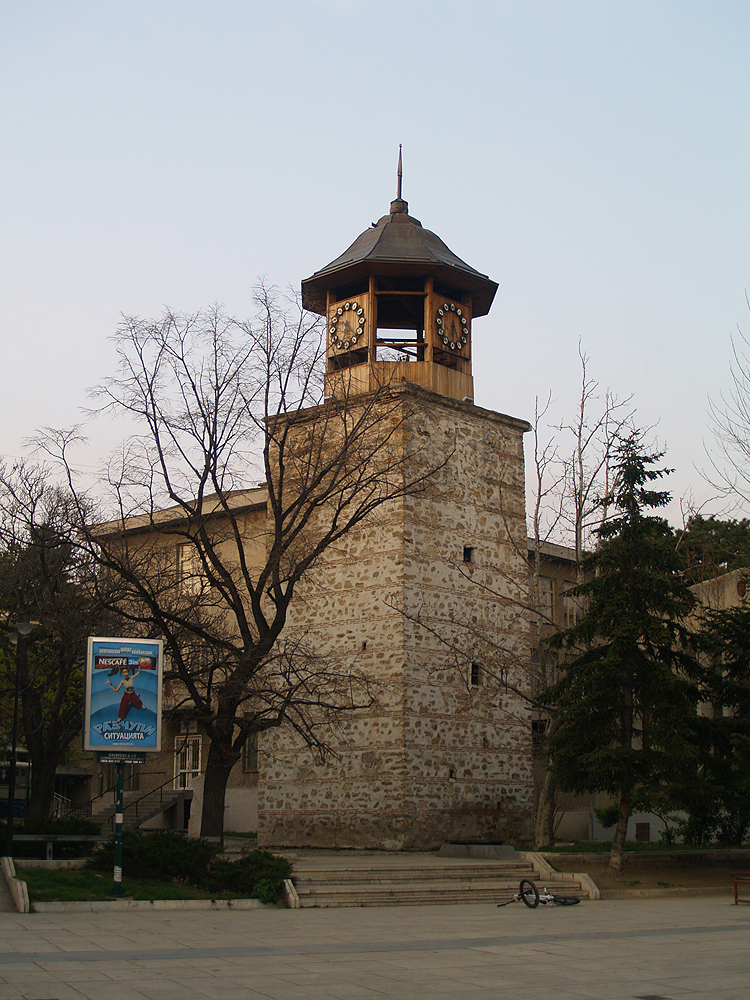
Sliven clock tower, built 1808

Tuida was an early Byzantine and medieval fortress, the remains of which are located on the hill of Hisarlaka in the northeastern part of Sliven, which offers a unique view of the "Sinite kamani" and the city (the hill is located near the "Novo Selo" quarter). It is part of the old mountain fortification system, which played an extremely important role in the defence of the Roman Empire, and later of the early Byzantine Empire, as well as the medieval Bulgarian state. After some interruption, archaeological excavations of the fortress began again in 2004. The aim of the excavations is the final study and conservation of the architectural and archaeological monuments, and the exposure of the fortress with a view to making it one of the city's notable tourist attractions.

=== The old clock tower ===
The old clock tower is located in the centre of Sliven, built in 1808. In 1936, a strong storm destroyed the upper wooden part, which was rebuilt about sixty years later in its original 19th century form

=== Sinite Kamani ===
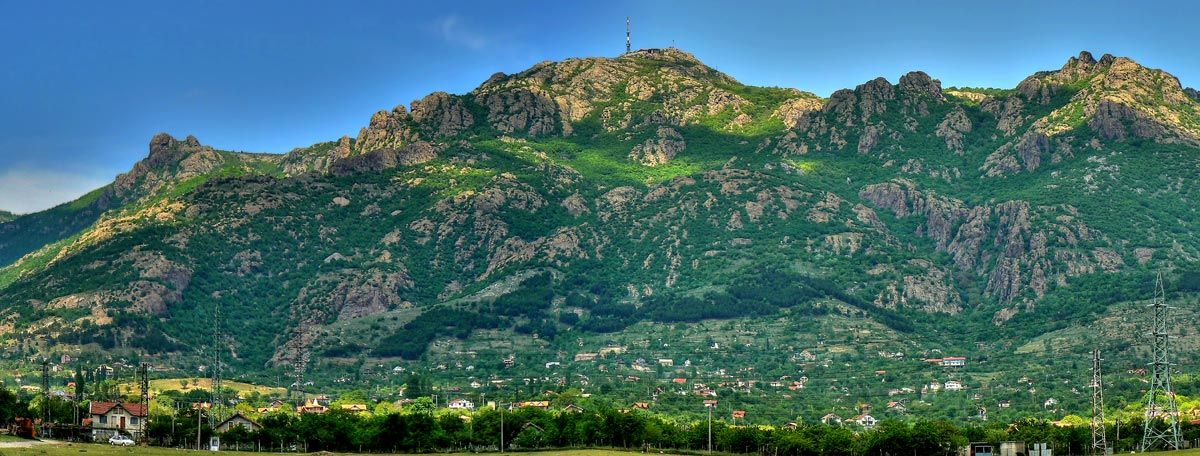
View to Sinite Kamani

The Sinite Kamani Nature Park is located in the Eastern Balkan Mountains just north of Sliven. It was declared a nature (then national) park in 1980. The park covers an area of 11 380 hectares, representing springs, peaks, rocks, forests and meadows. The highest point of the nature park is the peak of Bulgarka (1181 m). The local flora and fauna is represented by various species, some of which are included in the Red Book of Bulgaria.

== Notable people ==
- Aleksandar Kraychev, Olympic silver medalist
- Anton Pann
- Azis
- Damyan Damyanov
- Dobri Chintulov
- Dobri Zhelyazkov
- Desislava Bozhilova
- Georgi Dinev
- Georgi Kalaydzhiev (violinist)
- Hadzhi Dimitar
- Ivan Slavov (philosopher)
- Janis Rozitis
- Jordan Malinovski
- Julia Kristeva
- Kamen Tchanev
- Kevork Kevorkyan
- Konstantin Konstantinov
- Margarita Hranova
- Norair Nurikyan, two-time Olympic gold medalist in weightlifting
- Radoi Ralin
- Sava Dobroplodni
- Sirak Skitnik
- Stanka Pencheva
- Stanka Zlateva
- Vasil Vasilev-Zueka
- Violeta Gindeva
- Yordan Letchkov

== See also ==
- List of cities in Bulgaria
- Upper Thrace

== Twin towns – sister cities ==
Sliven is twinned with:

- Alba Iulia, Romania
- Chongqing, China
- Gera, Germany
- Jerash, Jordan
- Kaisariani, Greece
- Melitopol, Ukraine
- Pécs, Hungary
- Svietlahorsk, Belarus
- Taraclia, Moldova
- Tekirdağ, Turkey
- Ternopil, Ukraine
- Voronezh, Russia
- Bydgoszcz, Poland

== Gallery ==
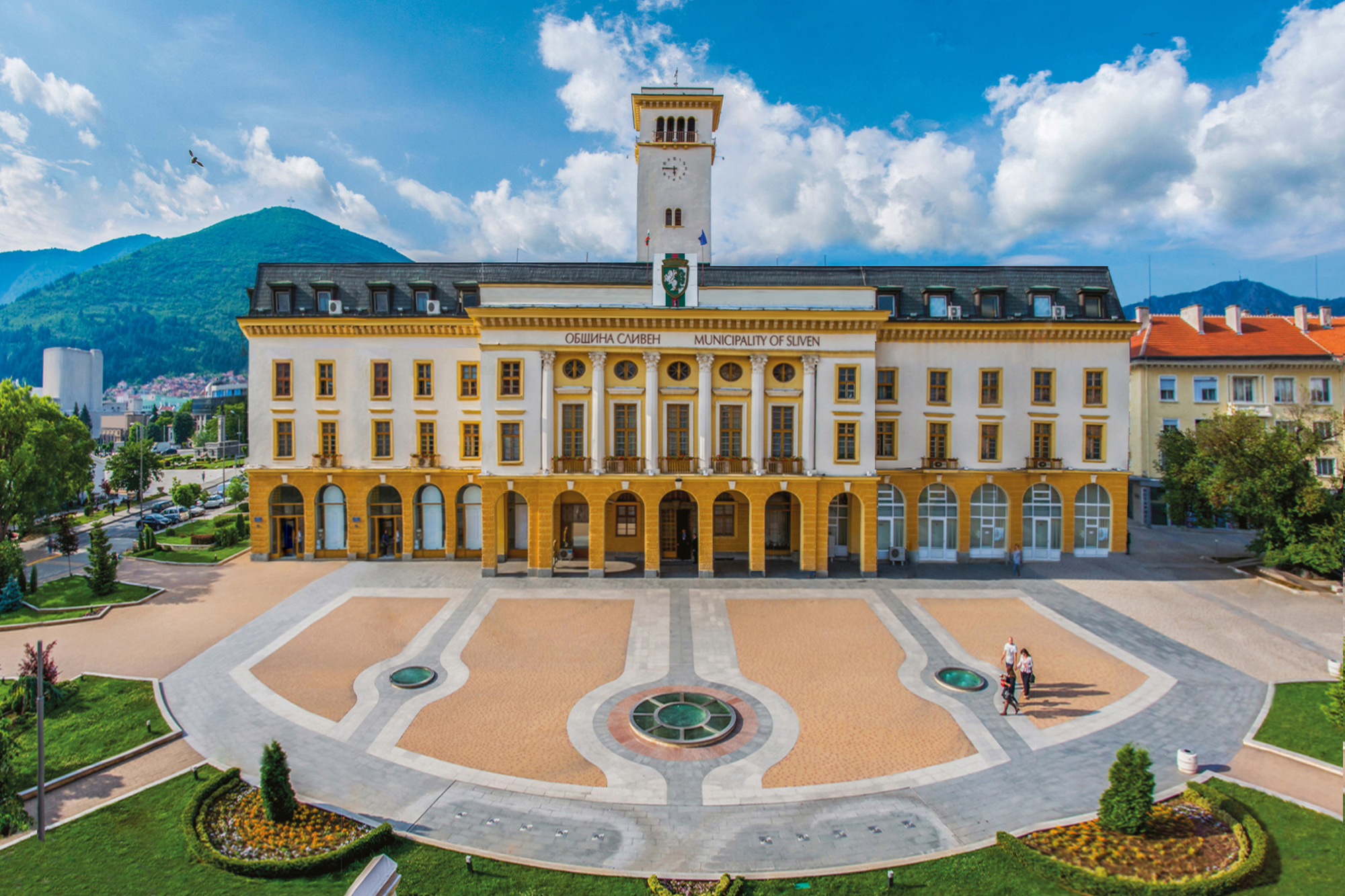
Municipality Hall

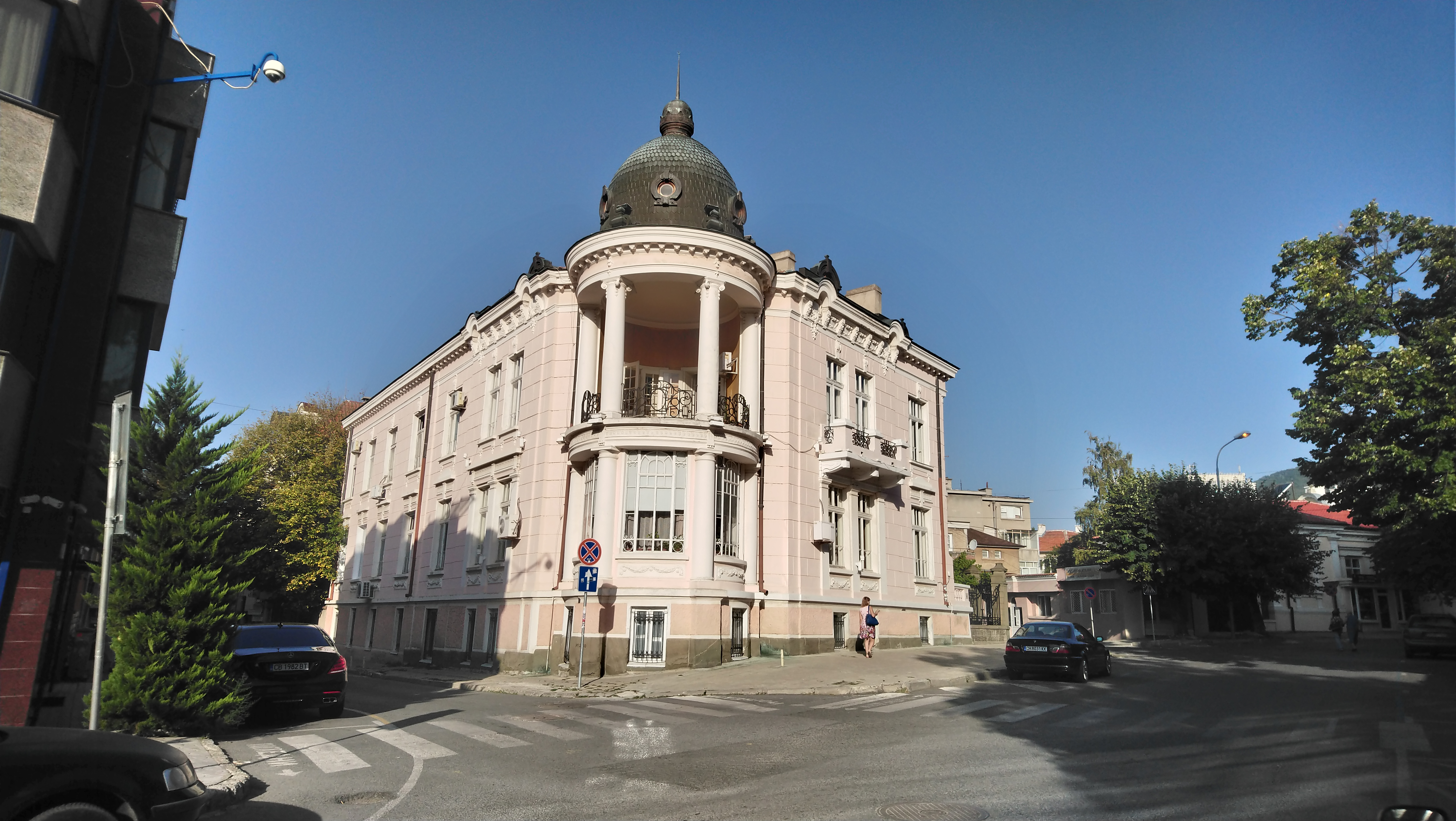
Regional Library Sava Dobroplodni

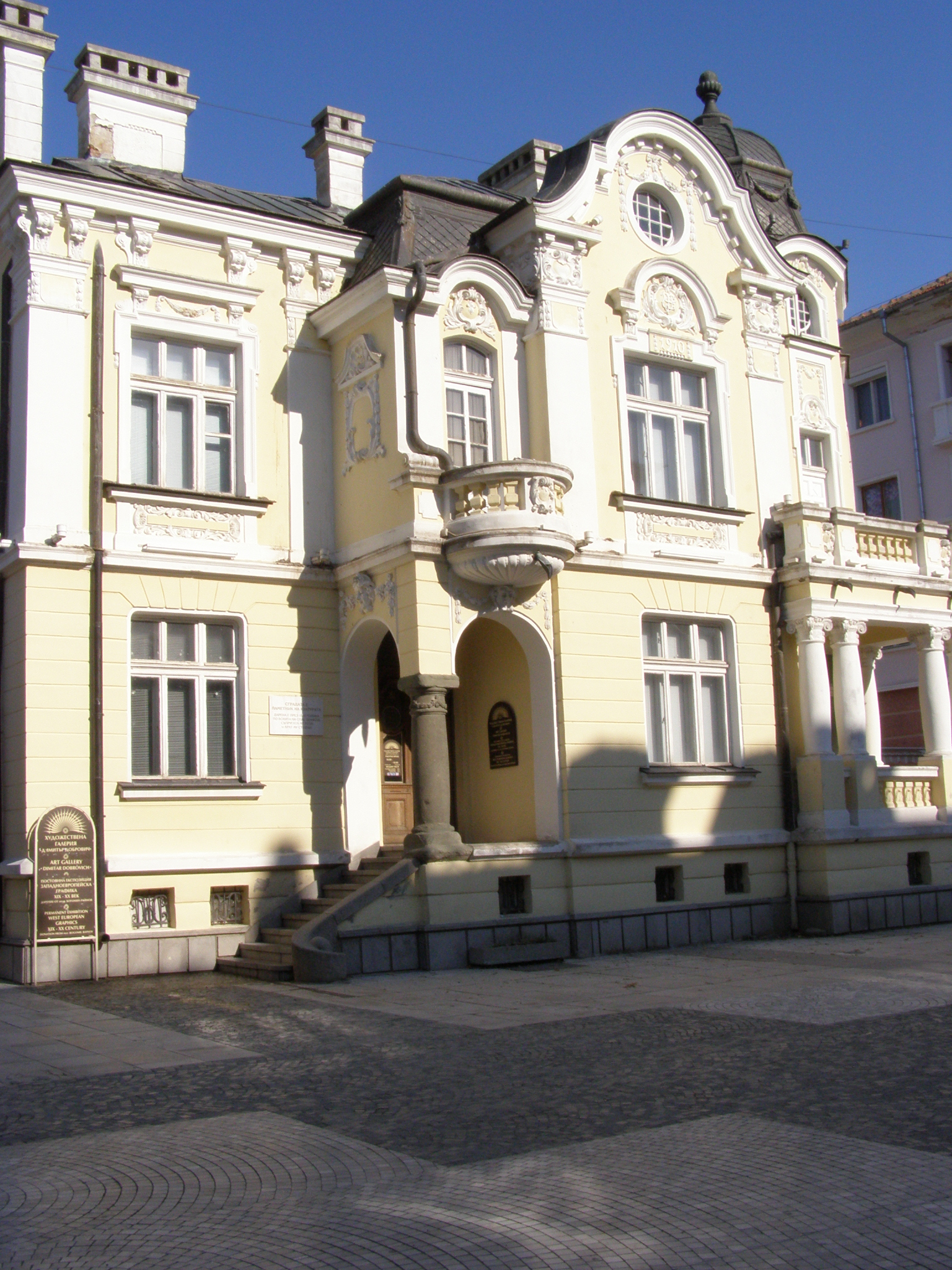
Gallery Dimitar Dobrovich

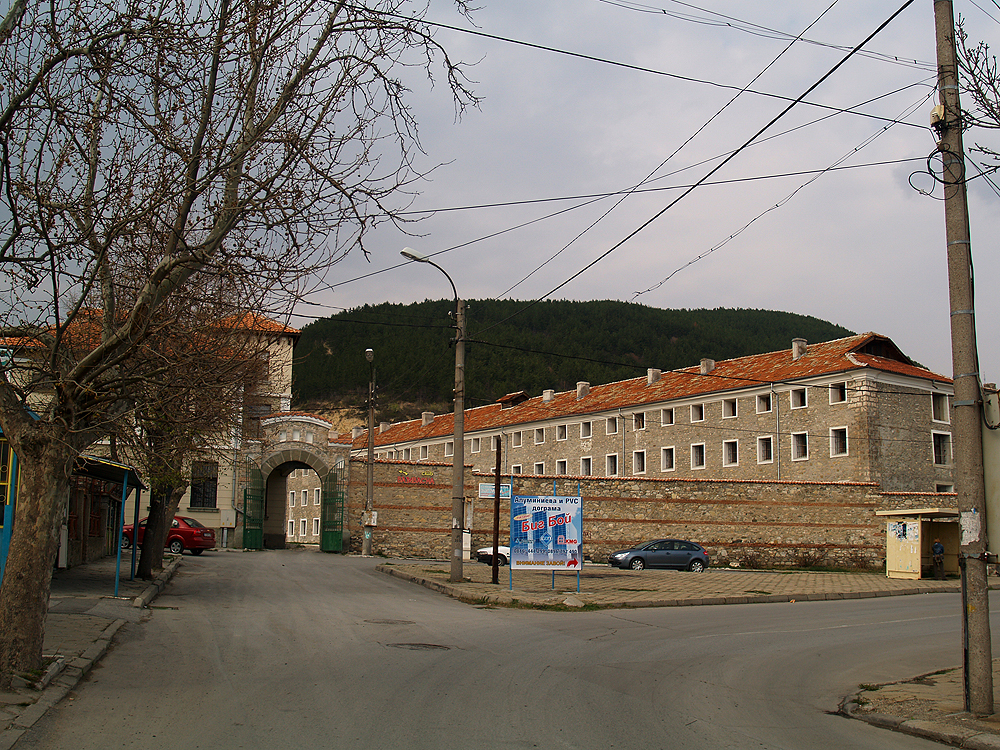
Museum of Textile

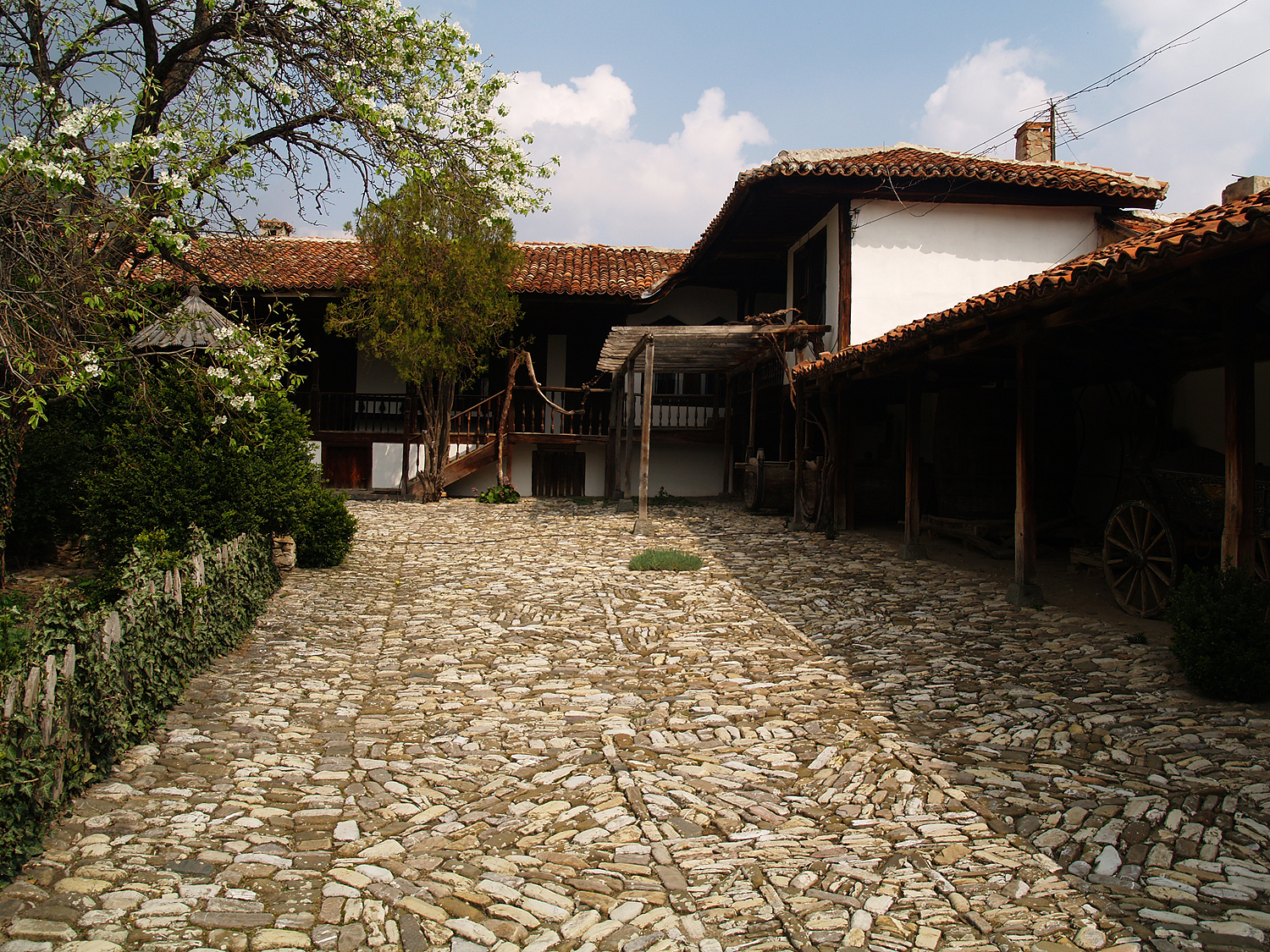
Lifestyle Museum

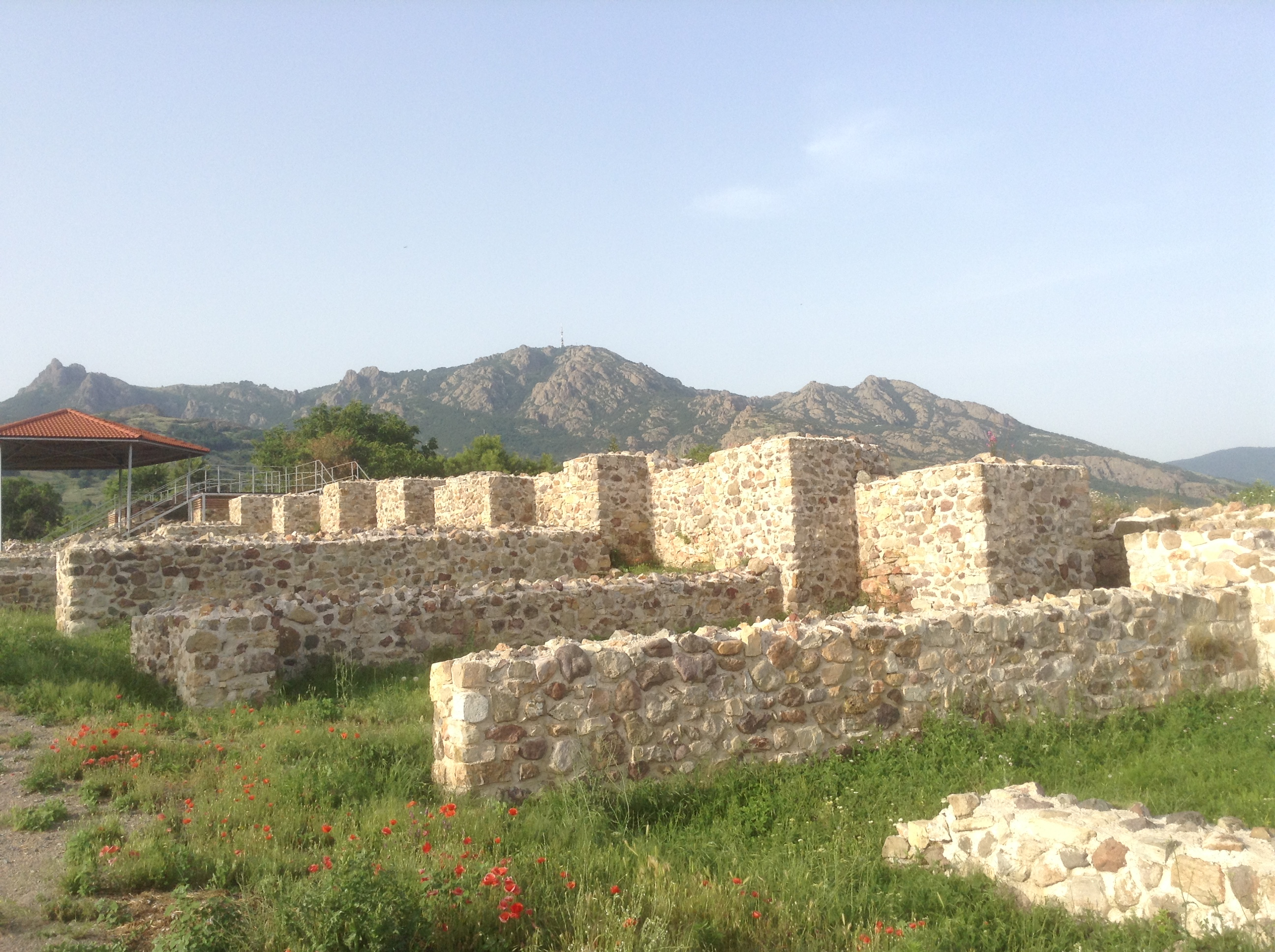
Remains of the fortress Tuida with the Sinite Kamani in the background

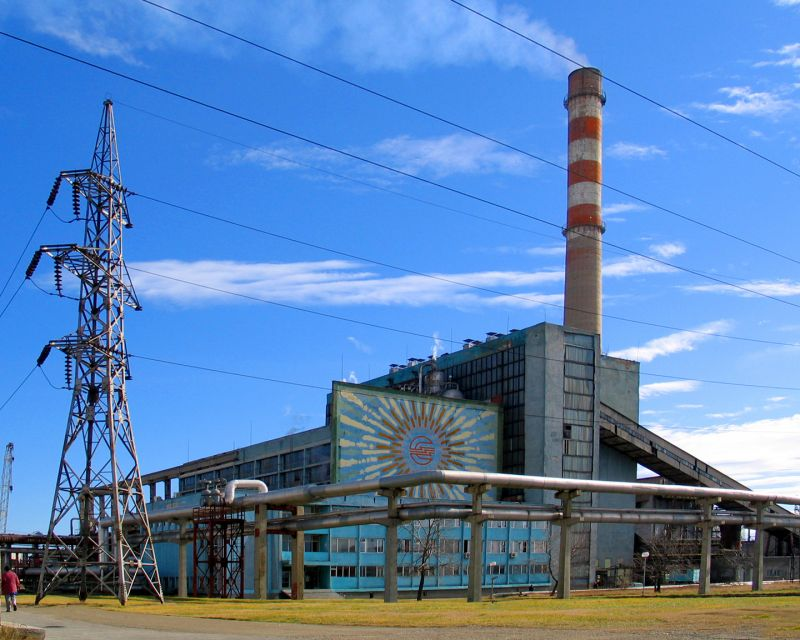
TPP Sliven

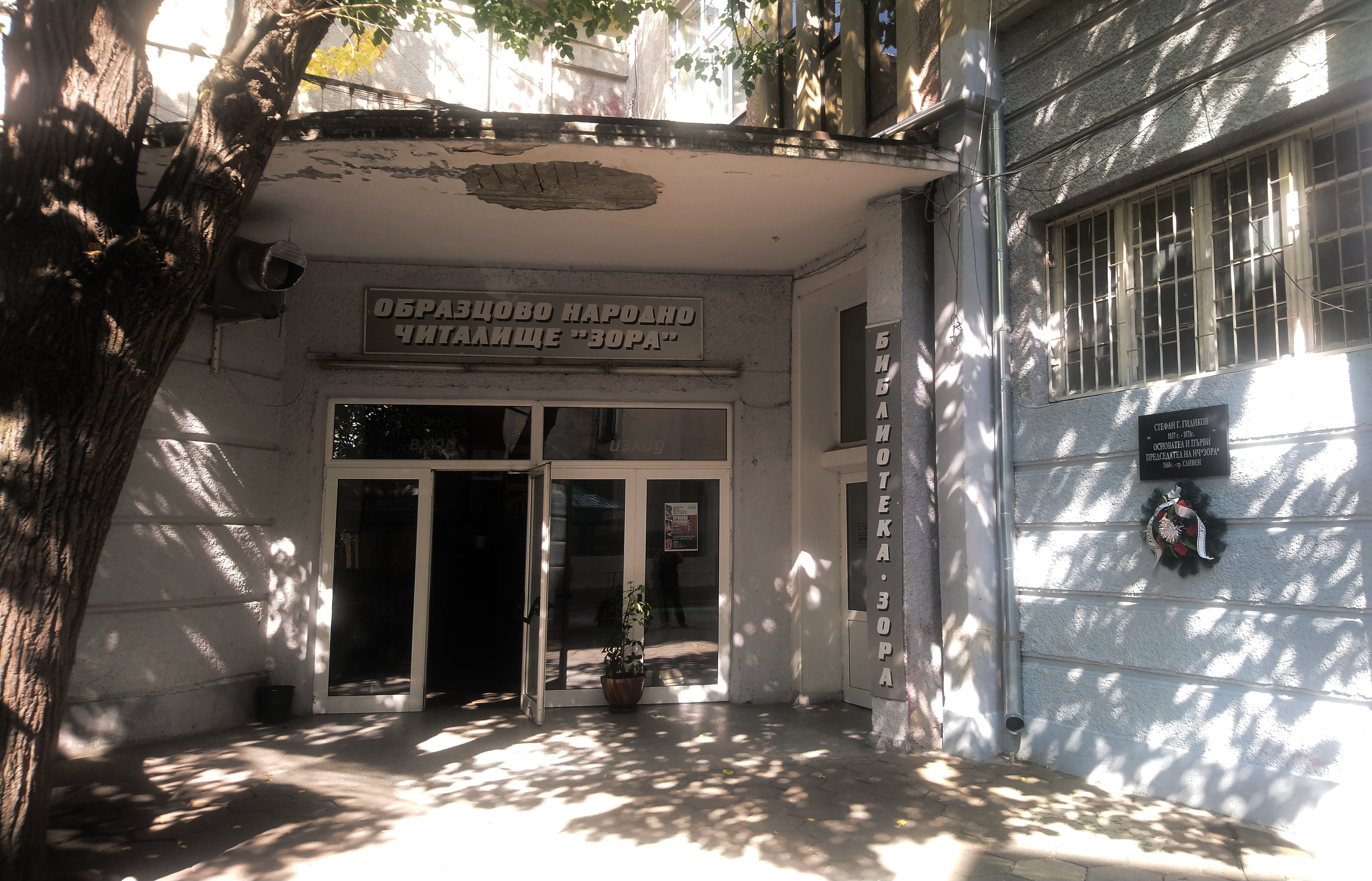
Chitalishte Zora
