= Jordan Malinovski =

Bulgarian scientist (1923–1996)

Acad. Jordan Malinowski (Bulgarian: Йордан Малиновски; 3 June 1923–12 March 1996) was an eminent Bulgarian scientist, specializing in physical Chemistry, a member of the Bulgarian Academy of Sciences (1979–1996). President of BAS (1992 — 1996).

== Biography ==
Jordan Malinowski was born in Sliven, Bulgaria 1923. He studied, worked and died in Sofia.

=== Education ===
Malinowski studied in the Sofia University 1948 and obtained Dr. in chemistry 1958, and D.Sc. 1959.

=== Professional experience ===
Malinowski was assistant Prof. (1948–1958) in the Institute of Physics, Bulgarian Academy of Sciences. He became Associate Professor 1959, and Professor 1964 – in the Institute of Physical Chemistry - BAS. Bulgarian Academy of Sciences elected him to a corresponding member 1979, member 1989, and President (1992–1996).

Malinowski was founder and first director of the Central Laboratory of Photo Process, now Institute of Optical Materials and Technologies BAS from 1967 to 1992
