= Dobri Zhelyazkov =

Bulgarian businessman

- Born: Dobri Zhelyazkov Fetisov; 1800; Sliven, Ottoman Empire
- Died: 1865; Sliven, Ottoman Empire
- Occupation: Industrialist, factory-owner
- Years active: 1820s-1865
- Known for: Founding the first textile factory in Bulgaria and the Ottoman Empire
- Spouse: Mariyka Yanakieva

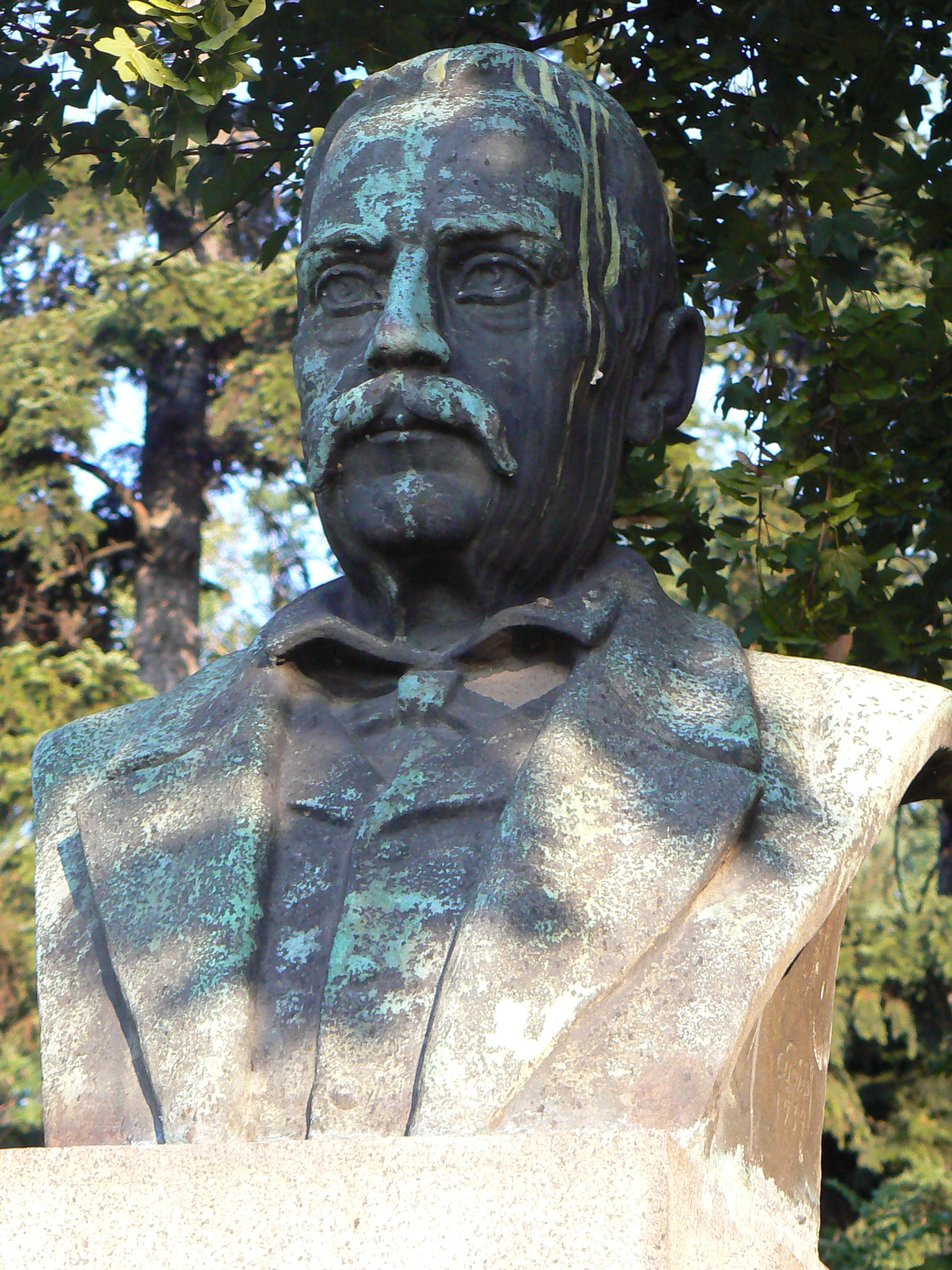
Monument to Dobri Zhelyazkov in Borisova gradina, Sofia

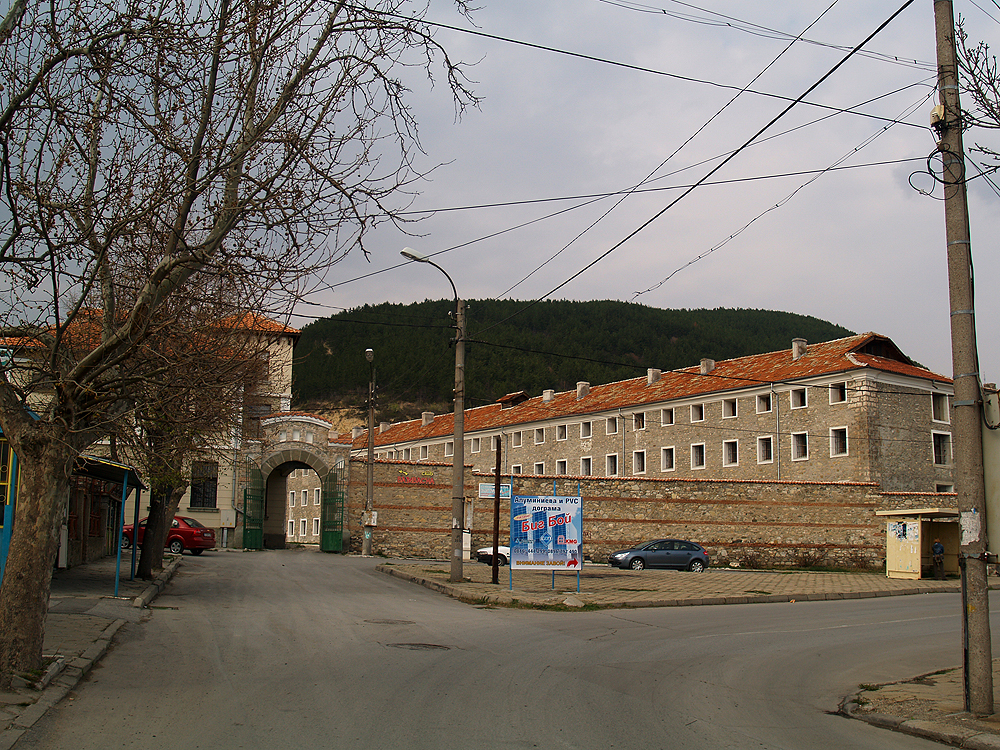
Dobri Zhelyazkov's factory in Sliven, built 1834

Dobri Zhelyazkov Fetisov (Bulgarian: Добри Желязков Фетисов, pronounced [ˈdɔbri ʒɛˈʎaskof fɛˈtisof]; 1800–1865) was the first Bulgarian factory-owner and industrialist, the founder of the first textile factory in Bulgaria and the Ottoman Empire.

== Life ==
Born in Sliven/İslimiye, Silistre Eyalet, Ottoman Empire, Zhelyazkov studied at the Greek school in his native town. Upon finishing, he tried several handicrafts until he discovered his talent in homespun tailoring. In the 1820s Zhelyazkov introduced an improved wool-carding machine in his work, drawing down upon himself the anger of his competitors, who complained to the authorities. However, this did not stop Zhelyazkov.

In 1826, Zhelyazkov co-founded the Secret Brotherhood (Тайно братство, Tayno bratstvo) together with Dr Ivan Seliminski. The organization, initially a social one, would develop into a political society. Following the outbreak of the Russo-Turkish War of 1828–1829, Zhelyazkov took part in the organization of an uprising in the region of Sliven. However, after the signing of the Treaty of Adrianople in 1829, Zhelyazkov was forced to flee to Russia in 1830. He settled in Crimea, marrying another emigrant, Mariyka Yanakieva, and became a wool and cloth merchant, touring the country and observing textile production.

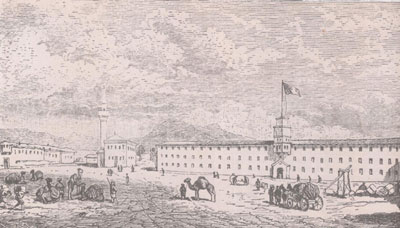
Dobri Zhelyazkov's factory in Sliven as drawn by Felix Philipp Kanitz

In 1834, Zhelyazkov returned to Sliven with his family and settled in his wife's house. There he constructed a production building (2.20 × 4.80 m, 3.80 m high), where he fitted looms, carding and spinning machines constructed by local smiths to designs brought from Russia. Zhelyazkov hired workers (including two Germans from Moravia) and began to produce homespun, frieze and broad cloth. While this once again angered his competitors, he also earned a number of admirers among the local citizens.

To look for support for his work, Zhelyazkov went to Istanbul and met the Sultan Mahmud II, a known reformer. Mahmud was impressed by Zhelyazkov's production and, in 1835, signed a contract with him officially establishing the Sliven textile factory. A sultan's firman gave Zhelyazkov a number of rights, including the right to supply cloth for the Ottoman Army and administration. In the same time, the Ottoman government was obliged to provide Zhelyazkov with machines and another building, while Zhelyazkov's obligations included supplying wool, furnishing the factory, hiring and paying to workers and selling the produced cloth for the price of 22 groschen per arshin. Zhelyazkov's work is regarded as a historical achievement initiating the encouragement of local industry in the empire.

The first to describe Zhelyazkov's factory was Ami Boué in 1837. In 1842, an expansion began, with another production building being constructed: one of the largest in Bulgaria during the period. In 1845, the factory became state property, and in 1853 Zhelyazkov's competitors libelled him and arranged his elimination from its administration. Zhelyazkov was sent to İzmit in Anatolia, where he was supposed to set up another factory. Zhelyazkov returned to Sliven in 1856 and, despite his long legal efforts to regain his rights over the Sliven factory, he died ill and in poverty in 1865.
