= Sinite Kamani Nature Park =

Nature park in Bulgaria

- IUCN category V (protected landscape/seascape)
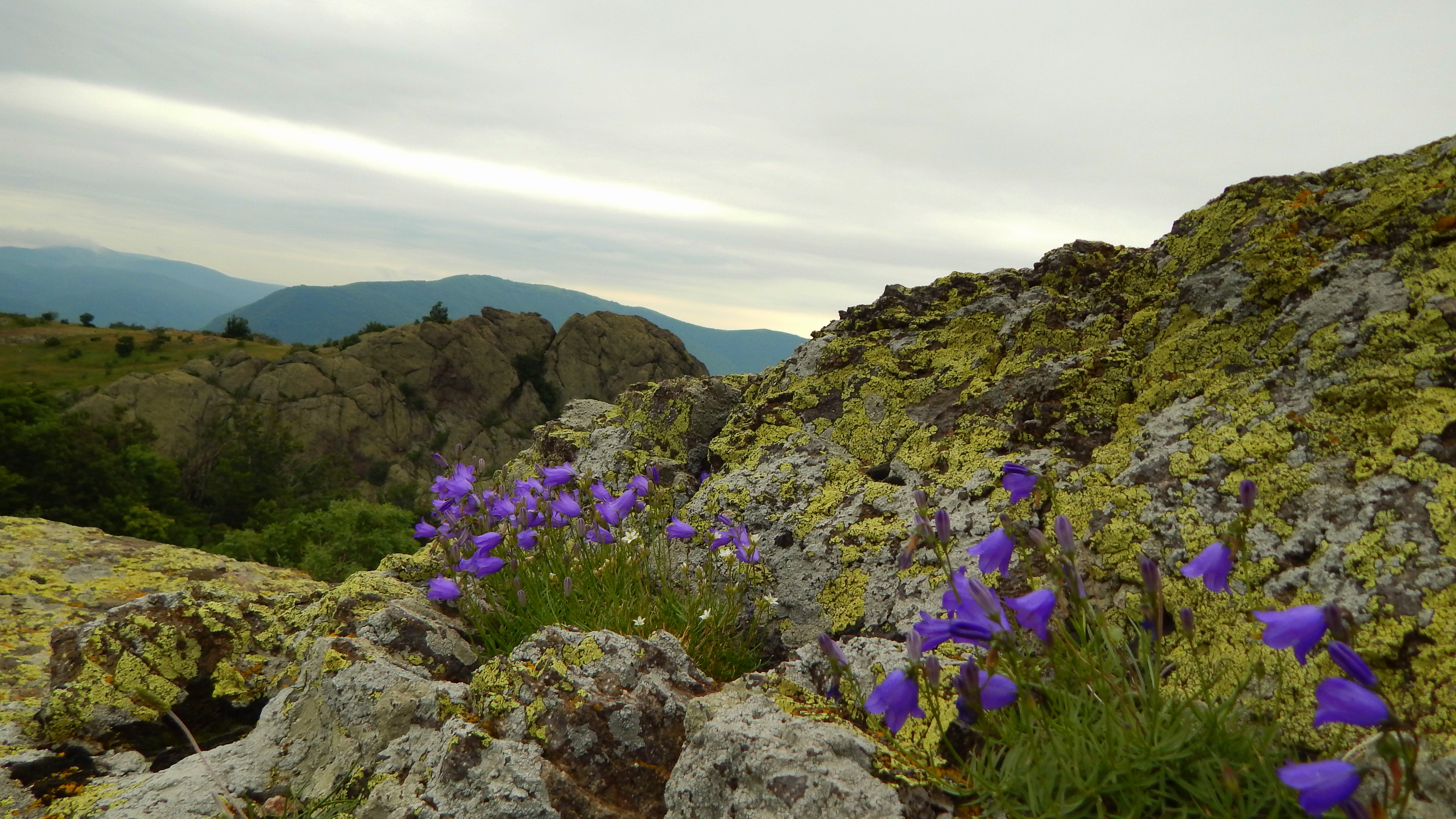

- Location within Bulgaria
- Location: Balkan Mountains, Sliven Province, Bulgaria
- Nearest city: Sliven
- Coordinates: 42°44′51″N 26°19′17″E
- Area: 113.8 square kilometres (43.9 mi^{2})
- Established: 1980
- Governing body: Ministry of Environment and Water

Sinite Kamani Nature Park (Bulgarian: Природен парк Сините камъни, meaning the Blue Stones) is a protected area in Bulgaria spanning a territory of 11380 ha or 113.8 km^{2} in the eastern Balkan Mountains. It was established on 28 November 1980 to protect the local ecosystems and landscape.

The nature park is situated in Sliven Province, its southern boundaries reaching the northern limits of the provincial capital Sliven. It includes the Kutelka Reserve. The park falls within the International Union for Conservation of Nature management category V (protected landscape/seascape). Its whole territory is included in the European Union network of nature protection areas Natura 2000 under the code Sinite Kamani BG0000164. Within its boundaries is located the Karandila resort area.

== Geography ==
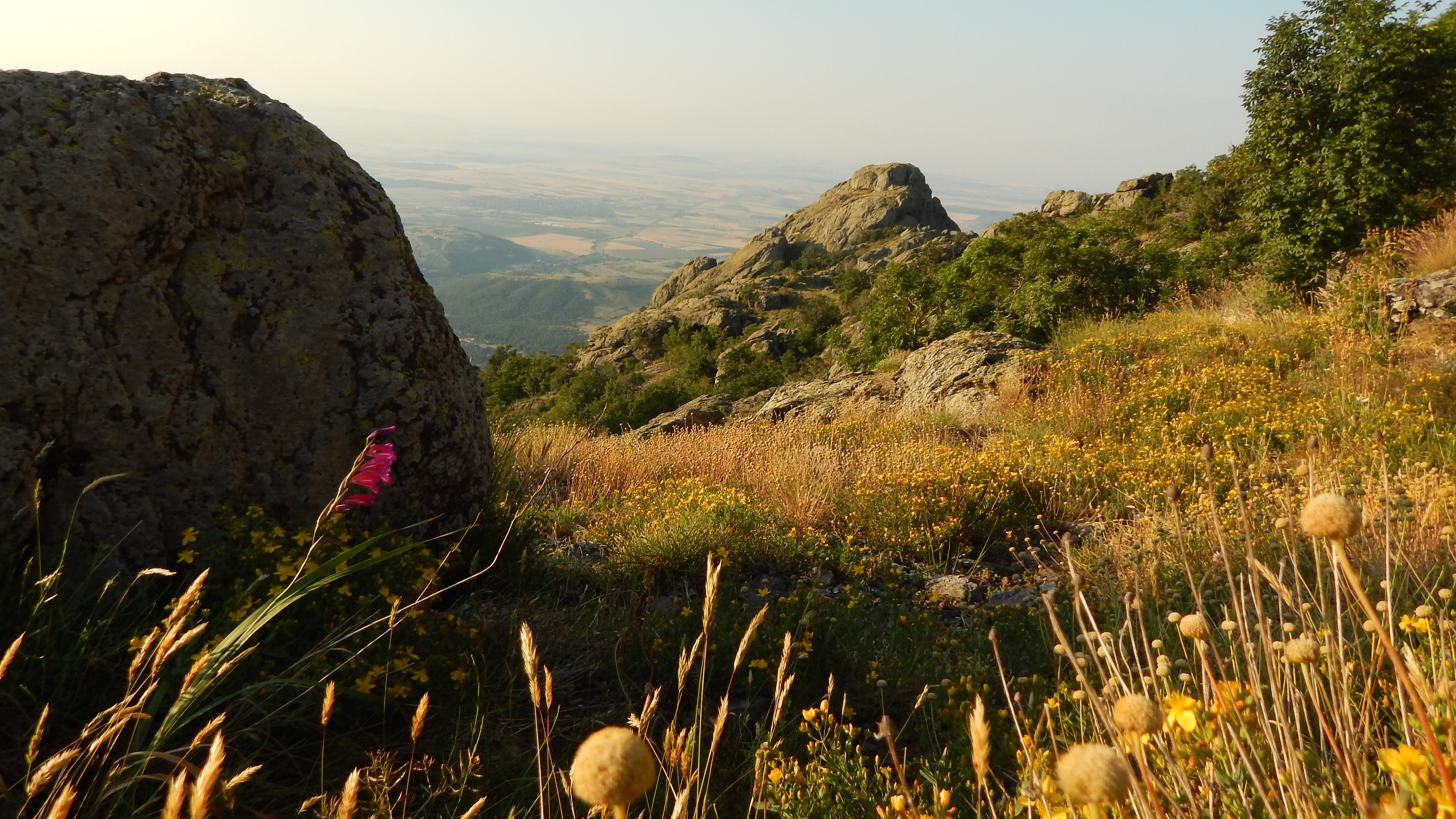
A view from Karandila

Sinite Kamani Nature Park is situated in the Sliven Mountain subdivision of the Balkan Mountains, lying just north of the Sliven Valley. The formation of the contemporary relief of the region began during the early Neogene period.

Due to the complex geological composition, the relief is highly dissected. Its lowest point is at an altitude of about 290 m; the highest point of is the summit of Bulgarka (1181 m), which is also the highest peak in the eastern Balkan Mountains. The elevation increases northwards, with the northern section of the park being the highest, where the main ridge of the Sliven Mountain is located. The northern slopes of the mountain are very steep and difficult to access, and are covered with extensive beech forests. The southern reaches of the park are occupied by ravines and crevices with sparse vegetation, represented mainly by individual trees. There are numerous caves, such as Zmeevi Dupki, Haydushkata Peshtera, Bachvata, Starite Dupki, etc.

Sinite Kamani itself is the name of a rock massif located on the territory of the nature park, formed under the influence of erosion and denudation processes. The massif is made up mainly of quartz rocks with various impurities and contains various rock formations, shaped under the influence of erosion processes, forming, valleys, caves, ravines, etc. The massif, as well as the surrounding areas, are one of the main tourist sites in the area.

Sinite Kamani Nature Park falls within the temperate continental climatic zone with Alpine influences at higher altitudes. The high areas have relatively low temperatures and high precipitation, while in the lower parts the temperatures are high and the precipitation is less abundant. The highest measured temperature is 41 °C, while the lowest is −20 °C. Snow cover lasts for about 3–4 months, with the earliest date for the appearance of permanent snow cover in the middle altitudes of the park being the beginning of November. The winds are predominantly northwesterly and northerly.

The main types of soils in the nature park are brown forest soils and cinnamon forest soils. The cinnamon forest soils cover the lower parts of the nature park, at an altitude below 800 m; the main soil-forming rocks for are conglomerates, limestones, tuffs and others. The brown forest soils are located at higher altitudes, between 800–1200 m. Their predominant soil-forming rocks are sandstones, limestones and dolomites.

== Biology ==
=== Flora ===
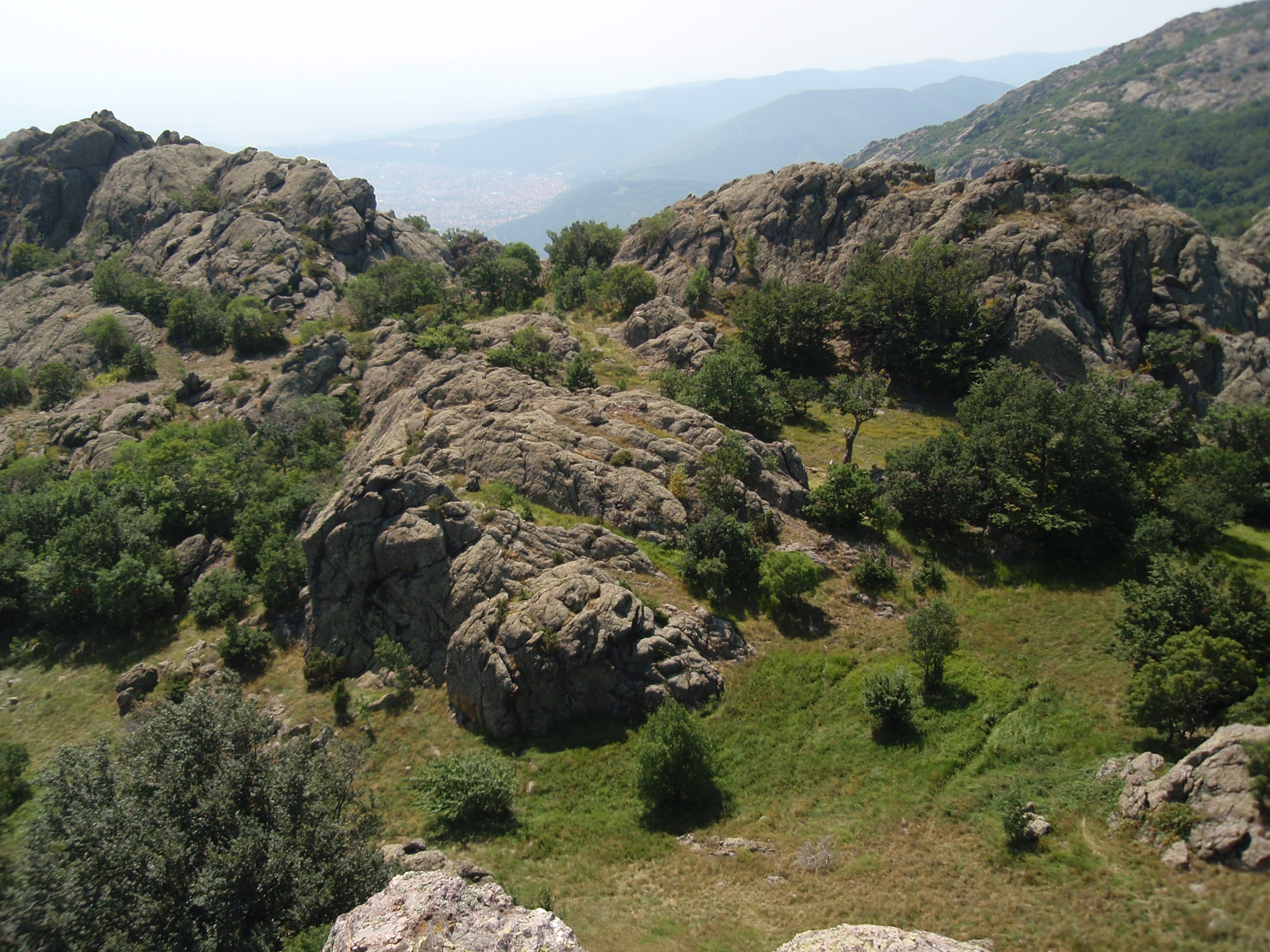
A view from the park

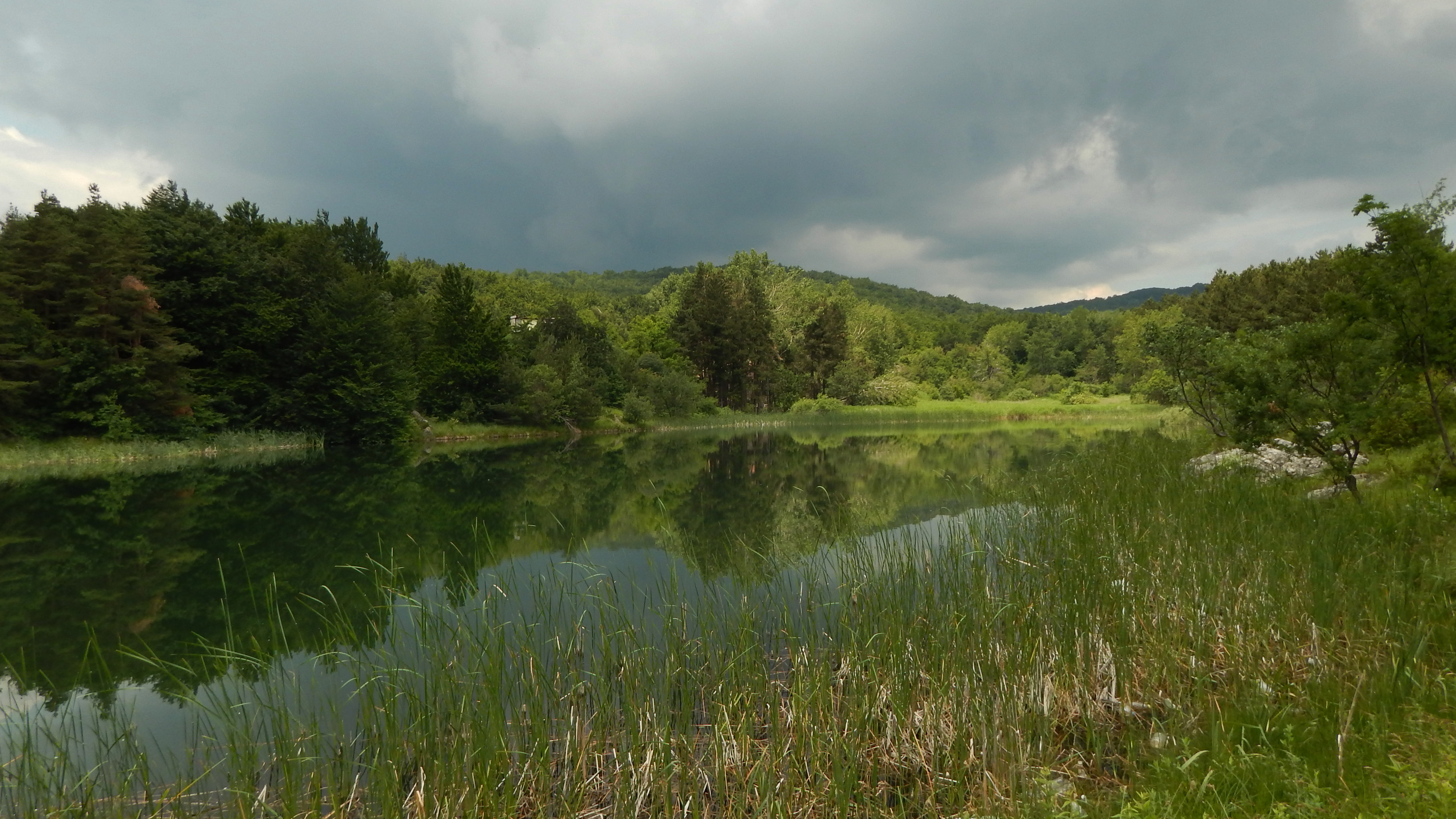
A pond in Karandila

Most of the park's area is forested. Deciduous forests cover 90% of its total territory, dominated by formations of Crimean beech (Fagus × taurica), a natural hybrid between European beech (Fagus sylvatica) and Oriental beech (Fagus orientalis). The age of the beech forest in the area of Kushbunar reaches 400 years. Other common tree species include sessile oak (Quercus petraea), Austrian oak (Quercus cerris), Hungarian oak (Quercus frainetto), European hornbeam (Carpinus betulus), Oriental hornbeam (Carpinus orientalis), Heldreich's maple (Acer heldreichii), sycamore maple (Acer pseudoplatanus), silver linden (Tilia tomentosa), silver birch (Betula pendula), wild cherry (Prunus avium), etc. The park contains the northernmost population of the kermes oak (Quercus coccifera) in Bulgaria.

There are 1027 species of land plants, includes 67 moss, 19 fern, 9 gymnosperm and 931 flowering plant species. Of them 43 are included in the Red Book of Bulgaria, counting several endangered species — Aethionema arabicum, Anemone sylvestris, Arabis nova, Colchicum szovitsii, Galanthus elwesii, Orchis militaris, Orchis spitzelii, Tulipa hungarica and Verbascum humile — as well as 36 rare or vulnerable species, such as Aquilegia nigricans, Himantoglossum caprinum, Pulsatilla halleri, etc.

There are 15 Bulgarian endemic species, including Anthemis rumelica, Anthemis virescens, Carduus thracicus, Clinopodium frivaldszkyanum, Medicago rhodopea, Thymelaea bulgarica, etc. and 28 Balkan endemics, such as Campanula jordanovii, Centaurea bovina, Centaurea gracilenta, Moehringia grisebachii, Moehringia jankae, Pilosella petraea, Verbascum adrianopolitanum, etc. There are also two relict species, Astracantha thracica and Limodorum abortivum. Sinite Kamani is the only place in Bulgaria where the Aethionema arabicum grows.

=== Fauna ===
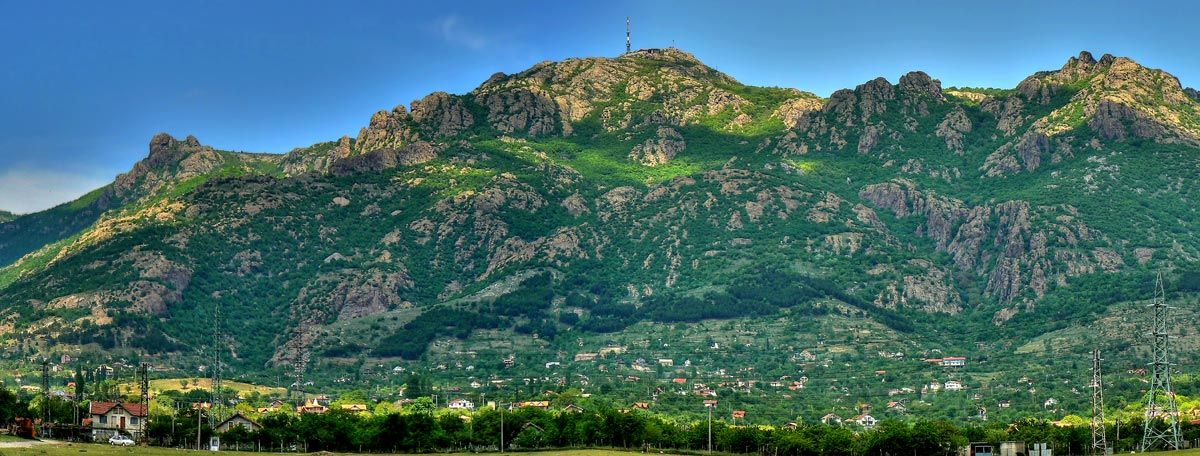
Sinite Kamani seen from the Sliven Valley

The fauna of Sinite Kamani Nature Park is diverse due to the proximity of the Upper Thracian Plain and includes both animals typical of the mountain areas and ones more closely associated with the sub-Mediterranean biomes.

The park is inhabited by 244 vertebrate species, including many endangered. There are 38 species of mammals, such as gray wolf, golden jackal, red fox, European pine marten, marbled polecat, Eurasian otter, European wildcat, red deer, roe deer, wild boar, European hare, southern white-breasted hedgehog, red squirrel, European ground squirrel, etc. There are at least 12 bats species: greater mouse-eared bat, lesser mouse-eared bat, long-fingered bat, Bechstein's bat, Geoffroy's bat, common bent-wing bat, greater horseshoe bat, lesser horseshoe bat, Mehely's horseshoe bat, Blasius's horseshoe bat, Mediterranean horseshoe bat and western barbastelle.

The avian species are 176, or about 70% of the park's vertebrates. There are 20 diurnal birds of prey due to the favourable nesting conditions of the rocky terrain. These include eastern imperial eagle, golden eagle, long-legged buzzard, Eurasian goshawk, Eurasian sparrowhawk, Eurasian hobby, peregrine falcon, Egyptian vulture, etc. The nocturnal birds of prey are represented by six species, such as Eurasian eagle-owl, Eurasian scops owl, western barn owl, etc. There are a number of taxa typical of warmer regions, like calandra lark, eastern black-eared wheatear and woodchat shrike. The rocky areas are habitat of chukar partridge and common rock thrush. Widespread birds across Sinite Kamani are great tit, Eurasian treecreeper, mistle thrush, common wood pigeon, stock dove and many others.

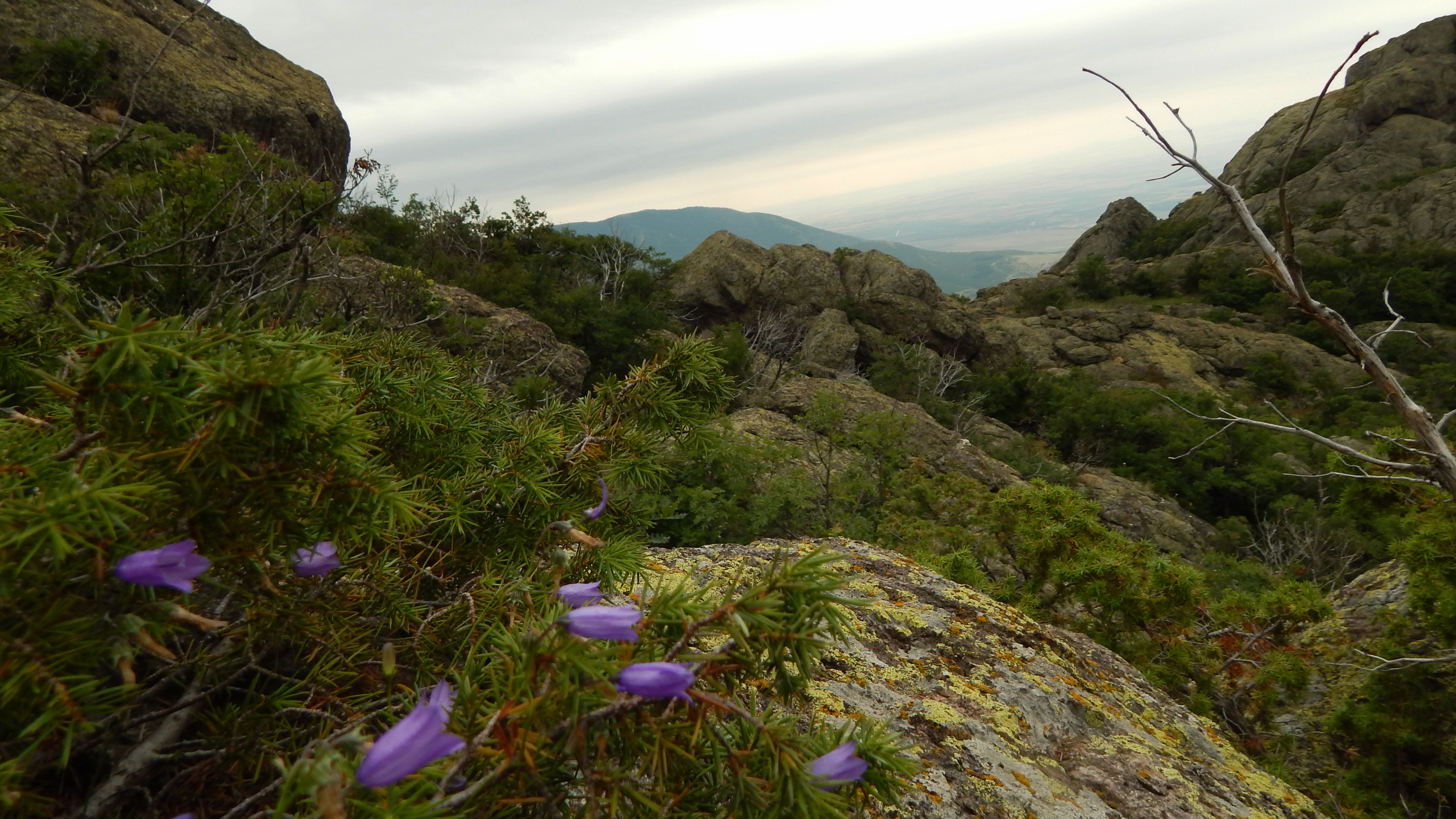
A view of Sinite Kamani

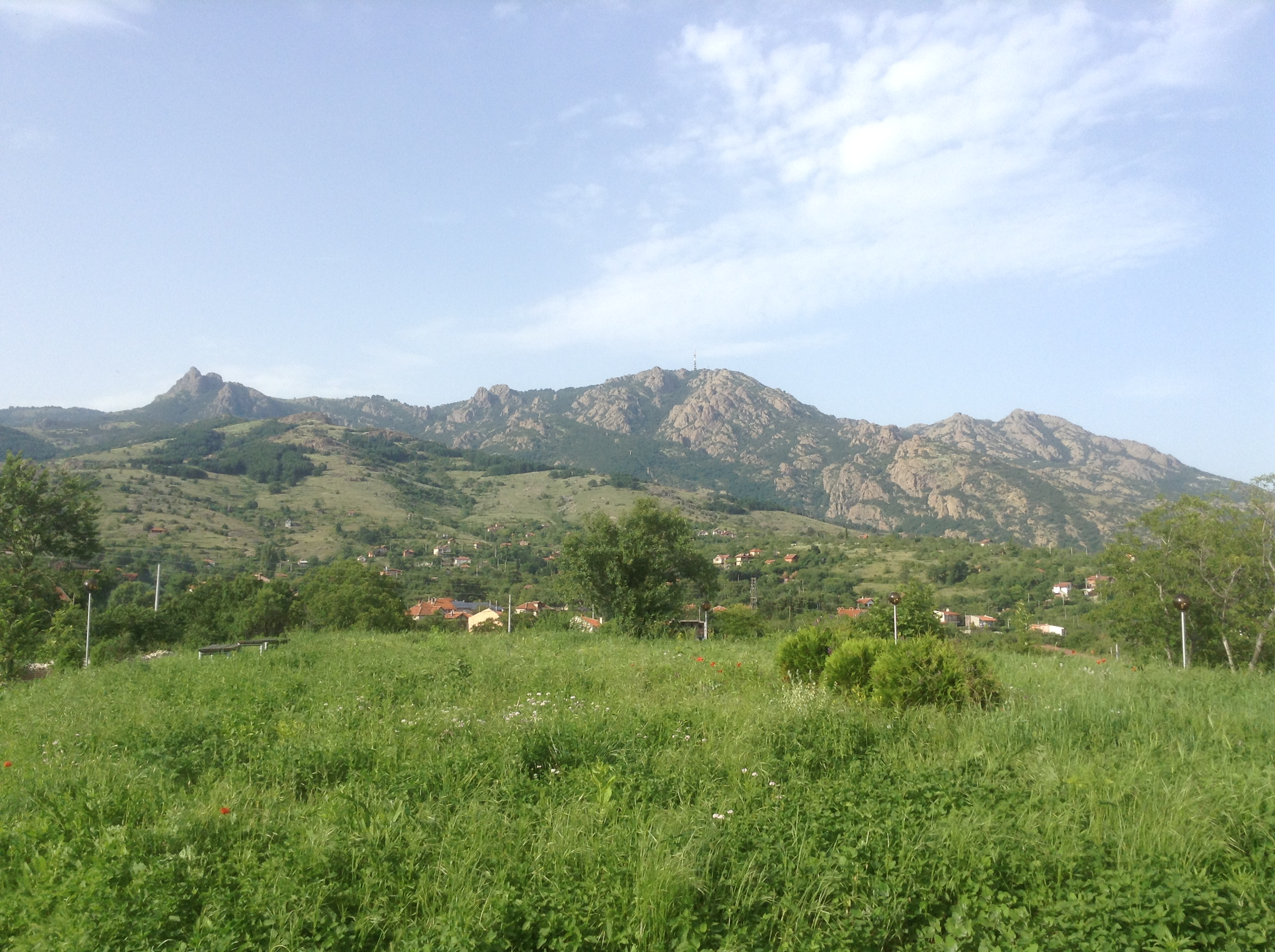
Sinite Kamani seen from the fortress of Tuida

The hepterofauna includes 13 reptile and 8 amphibian species. The former include common European adder, horned viper, Balkan green lizard, Balkan wall lizard, Aesculapian snake, Greek tortoise, Hermann's tortoise, European pond turtle, etc. Common amphibians are fire salamander, Balkan crested newt, smooth newt, yellow-bellied toad and common frog.

There are nine fish species, including river trout, round-scaled barbel and common minnow.

The invertebrate fauna is poorly studied, although the first information about butterflies in Bulgaria came from the Sliven region in the 1830s. There are 1153 identified species, of them 420 have a limited areal and are considered rare, and 51 are endemic. The most common order of insects is by far the Lepidoptera with 826 taxa. Invertebrates of conservational importance include Lucanus cervus, Rosalia alpina, Calosoma sycophanta, Palpares libelluloides, etc. The park is the only place in Bulgaria where the spiders Leptorchestes mutilloides and Thanatus imbecillus have been recorded.

== Tourism ==
Sinite Kamani Nature Park is a popular destination for outdoors tourism and activities, including mountain climbing, caving, cycling, motoring, paragliding, ski sports and mountain hiking. There is a well-organized network of around 50 tourism paths and trails. Within its boundaries is located the Karandila resort area with resting and restaurant facilities, accessible via road or a lift from Sliven.

At the foothills of the Sinite Kamani massif at the outskirts of Sliven are the ruins of late Antiquity fortress of Tuida, which became part of the First Bulgarian Empire in the early 8th century after the Byzantine–Bulgarian treaty of 716. During the Second Bulgarian Empire several churches and monasteries were constructed within the territory of the modern park. Nowadays there are remains of two fortresses, a church and a monastery.

== See also ==
- Geography of Bulgaria
- List of protected areas of Bulgaria
- List of mountains in Bulgaria
- Balkan Mountains

== Sources ==
=== References ===
- Георгиев (Georgiev), Владимир (Vladimir) (1988). Енциклопедия България. Том VI. С-Ти [Encyclopaedia Bulgaria. Volume VI. S-Ti] (in Bulgarian). и колектив. София (Sofia): Издателство на БАН (Bulgarian Academy of Sciences Press).
- Мичев (Michev), Николай (Nikolay); Михайлов (Mihaylov), Цветко (Tsvetko); Вапцаров (Vaptsarov), Иван (Ivan); Кираджиев (Kiradzhiev), Светлин (Svetlin) (1980). Географски речник на България [Geographic Dictionary of Bulgaria] (in Bulgarian). София (Sofia): Наука и култура (Nauka i kultura).
- Donchev, Doncho; Karakashev, Hristo (2004). Теми по физическа и социално-икономическа география на България [Topics on Physical and Social-Economic Geography of Bulgaria] (in Bulgarian). София (Sofia): Ciela. ISBN 954-649-717-7.
- Golemanski, Vasil; Peev, Dimitar; Chipev, Nesho; Beron, Petar; Biserkov, Valko (2015). Red Book of Bulgaria, Volume I (in Bulgarian). Sofia: Bulgarian Academy of Sciences. ISBN 978-954-9746-18-1.

=== External links ===
- "Sinite Kamani Nature Park". Official Site of Sinite Kamani Nature Park.
- "Sinite Kamani Nature Park". Official Tourism Portal of Bulgaria.
- "Sinite Kamani Nature Park". Executive Environment Agency.
