= Great Bulgarian Forest =

Western Bulgaria and Eastern Serbia area

Coordinates: 42°56′N 22°57′E

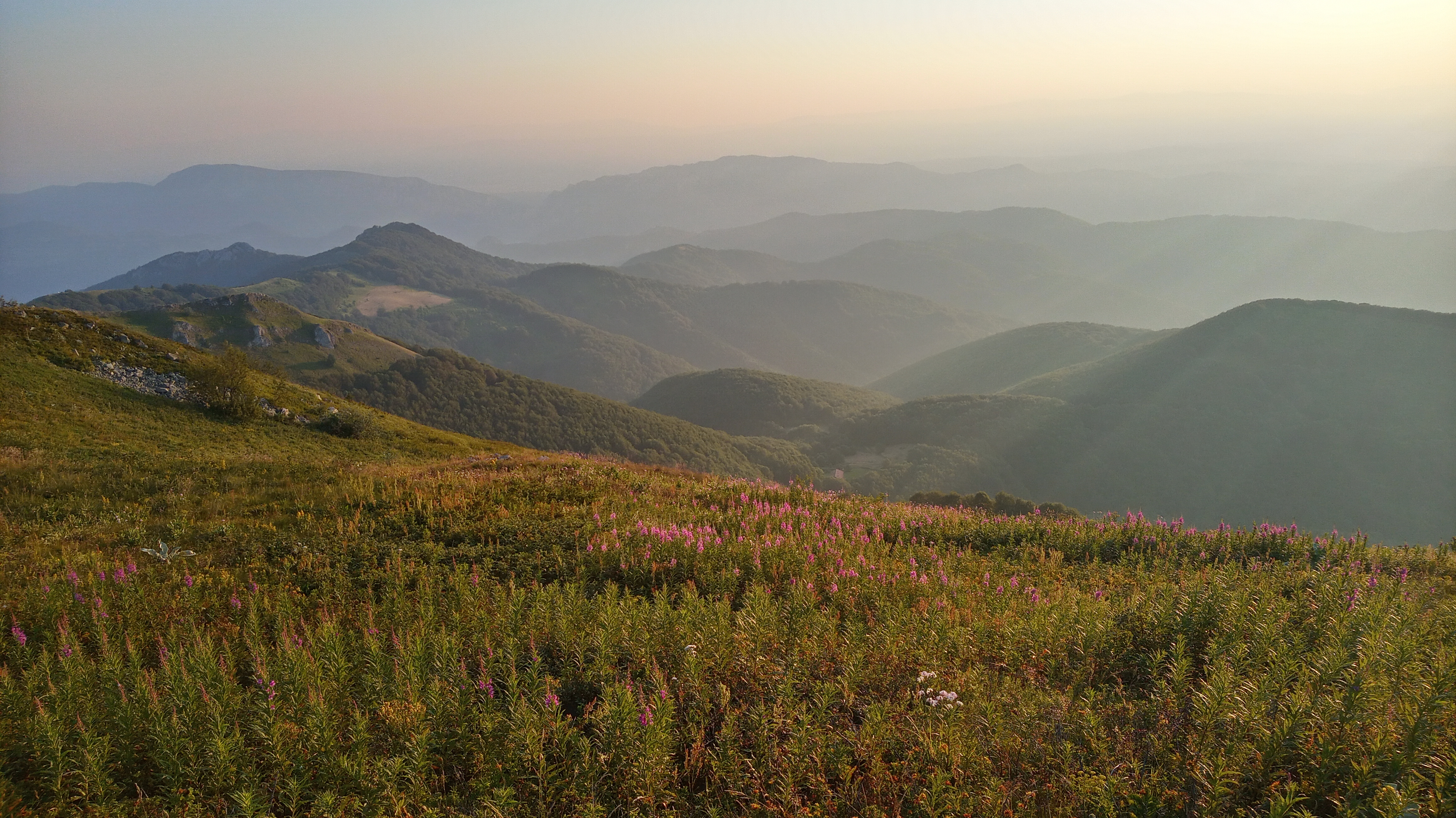
View from the summit of Ruy, on the Serbia-Bulgaria border.

Great Bulgarian Forest (Latin: Silva Magna Bulgarica or Silvas Bulgarorum; Bulgarian: Българска гора, Великата българска гора, Български лес, romanized: Bŭlgarska gora, Velikata bŭlgarska gora, Bŭlgarski les; Serbian: Бугарска гора, romanized: Bulgarska gora) is the historical name for the territory between Niš and the Gate of Trajan, entering Via Militaris in Thrace, a stretch of about 400 km (250 mi).

Usually the name Bulgarian Forest referred to the mountain hills overgrown with dense forests along the Great Morava and Nisava, including the massifs of mountain ranges in today's central parts of Eastern Serbia and Western Bulgaria. In the narrower geographical sense, the territory covers the forested mountain ranges of the Timok Valley (according to the Romanian understanding of the area), located east of the Great Morava River.

== History ==
In the Middle Ages, the region was known as a region of particularly dense forest. Participants in the first three Crusades in the eleventh and twelfth centuries, passing along Via Militaris, required eight days to traverse the area, sometimes walking two days and two nights without seeing another person. This was the area between Nis and Pazardzhik.

During the First Crusade, the forces of Peter the Hermit skirmished with armed locals during their passage through the region.

Although the last known aurochs died in 1627 in Poland, a relict population may have survived longer within the Great Bulgarian Forest. In 2020, a subfossil aurochs horn core was excavated from Sofia in a layer of deposits dated from the second half of the 17th century to the first half of the 18th century.

Deforestation at the hands of humans largely destroyed the old-growth forests of Bulgaria. Until the Principality of Bulgaria achieved formal independence in 1878, the Ottoman Empire made extensive use of the area such that "the dense forests which formerly had covered the country had almost entirely disappeared." Despite repeated attempts by the Bulgarian government to enforce forestry regulations, state control was nominal at best and the remaining forest saw heavy exploitation. By 1922, Bulgaria's forest ecosystem had largely shifted to a shrub woodland habitat known as shiblyak.

== See also ==
- Bulgaria (theme)
- Belgrad Forest
