= Michael Taylor (forester) =

American forester (born 1966)

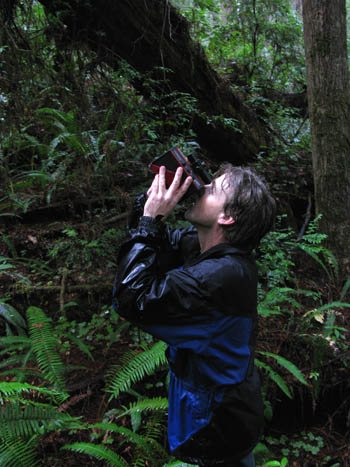
- Michael Taylor in Redwood National Park taking a preliminary measurement with a laser rangefinder
- Born: Michael W. Taylor; 25 April 1966 (age 60); Los Angeles, California, U.S.
- Occupation: Forester
- Known for: Discovery of Hyperion (tree), the tallest tree in the world; discovery of various other notable redwoods

Michael W. Taylor (born 25 April 1966) is an American forester who is notable for being a leading discoverer and champion of tallest trees - most notably coast redwoods. In 2006, Taylor co-discovered the tallest known tree in the world, a coast redwood (Sequoia sempervirens) now named "Hyperion". He also discovered "Helios" and "Icarus", the 2nd and 3rd tallest.

National Geographic made a video about the discovery and measuring of Hyperion. The discovery made headlines.

Taylor has discovered 50 coast redwoods over 350 feet (107 m) tall, and co-discovered approximately 100 more with Chris Atkins and Stephen Sillett, who is the first holder of the Kenneth L. Fisher Chair in Redwood Forest Ecology at Humboldt State University. Taylor and Sillett have collaborated and measured remarkable previously unknown redwoods. Their discoveries have fueled research and public interest in coast redwoods, which are now a World Heritage Site.

Michael is a main character of the non-fiction book (2007) The Wild Trees. The narrative includes how Taylor began exploring for tall trees, measuring tallest trees, and later networking with Pacific coast forest researchers.

Taylor co-discovered the largest known coast redwood named Lost Monarch in the Grove of Titans, as well as Iluvatar in Prairie Creek Redwoods State Park.

== Tallest tree discoveries ==
Redwoods: Helios and Icarus were discovered in 2006, shortly before Hyperion. Hyperion was the record height coast redwood that prompted National Geographic Society and Save-the-Redwoods League to coordinate a documentary. These are just 3 of many coast redwoods over 350 feet (107 m) feet which Michael Taylor discovered. The details are chronicled at www.talltreesclub.org

Tree Name	Height	
	m	ft
Hyperion	115.61	379.3
Helios	114.58	375.9
Icarus	113.14	371.2

Pines: Discovery of 4 new world's tallest pine trees, January, 2011.

== Largest coast redwood discoveries ==
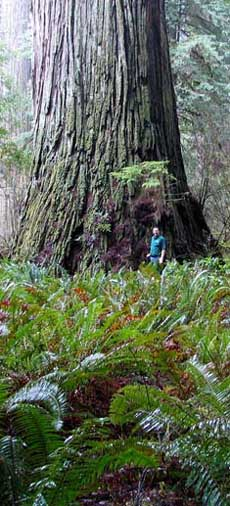
Del Norte Titan is the 4th largest coast redwood known, which Michael Taylor discovered with Dr. Steven Sillett, in Jedediah Smith Redwoods State Park.

Taylor discovered and co-discovered the largest known coast redwoods. The locations of these trees have not been disclosed by the National and California State Parks to the general public. For more information see www.landmarktrees.net

Tree Name	Location	Height		Diameter (b.h)		Volume		Source
		m	ft	m	ft	m^{3}	ft^{3}	
Lost Monarch	JSRSP	97.5	320	7.9	26	1203.46	42,500	
Fusion Giant, aka Melkor	RNP	106.3	349	6.8	22	1107.2	39,100	
Iluvatar	PCRSP	91.43	300.0	6.25	20.5	1061.88	37,500	
Del Norte Titan	JSRSP	93.6	307	7.3	24	1053.38	37,200	
El Viejo Del Norte	JSRSP	98.7	324	7.1	23	1002.41	35,400	
Howland Hill Giant	JSRSP	100.6	330	5.85	19.2	950.9	33,580	

== Education ==
Taylor attended Humboldt State University from 1984 to 1987 studying forestry, attended San Diego State University in 1988, returned to Humboldt State University 1992-94 completing a Bachelor of Science in environmental engineering.

== Location ==
Michael Taylor resides in northern California.
