= Grove of Titans =

Redwood grove in Northern California, US

Coordinates: 41°46′41″N 124°5′59″W

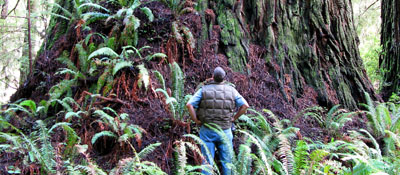
Man looking at Screaming Titans, one of the coastal redwood trees in the Grove of Titans

The Grove of Titans is a redwood grove in Del Norte County, Northern California, with several massive coast redwood (Sequoia sempervirens) trees, some of the largest known redwoods in terms of wood volume. The largest coastal redwood tree in the grove by volume is the single-stem Del Norte Titan. The Lost Monarch is comparably large, but a large sprout from the ground at its base is not part of the main trunk structure.

== History ==
The unofficially named Grove of Titans was discovered May 11, 1998, by botanist Stephen Sillett, and naturalist Michael Taylor in Jedediah Smith Redwoods State Park. The discovery implies that Sillett and Taylor are the first to realize and declare the significance of the grove, not that they were the first ones ever to see it.

In approximately 2011, a person from Oregon learned of and posted the grove's geolocation online and a surge of visitors followed. The increased boot traffic triggered problems like damage to native plants, soil compaction, difficulty for scientists, and strain on limited park resources. Between 2012 and 2016, approximately 8,000 square feet (740 m^{2}) of ferns, sorrel and other plants were destroyed by visitors. The native plant damage was most evident around a redwood called Screaming Titans. In July 2016 the parks posted a sign which states up to 36,000 square feet (3,300 m^{2}) impacted.

Starting on November 6, 2019, construction began on a 1,300-foot-long elevated walkway (400 m) through the Grove of Titans. The trail segment and boardwalk opened with limited access in September 2021. The remaining 2 miles (3.2 km) of the Mill Creek Trail renovation will be completed by early summer 2022. The project cost is $3.5 million and being paid for by a partnership including Save the Redwoods League, California State Parks, the National Park Service, and Redwood Parks Conservancy.

== Flora ==
Names of the named largest redwoods in this grove include Lost Monarch, El Viejo del Norte, Screaming Titans, Eärendil and Elwing, Beregond, Aragorn, Sacajawea, Aldebaran, Stalagmight and Del Norte Titan.

Several abundant understory plants are California sword fern – Polystichum munitum and Redwood sorrel – Oxalis oregana.

== Location ==
The Grove of Titans is in Jedediah Smith Redwoods State Park of Northern California, off Howland Hill Road south of Highway 199. The closest town is Crescent City, California. The location was described by author Richard Preston in his 2007 book The Wild Trees as "the bottom of a hidden notch-like valley near a glade." The exact location was not revealed in this book for fear of excessive traffic.

== See also ==
- Redwood National and State Parks
