= Lost Monarch =

5th largest known living coast redwood when counting only the main stem

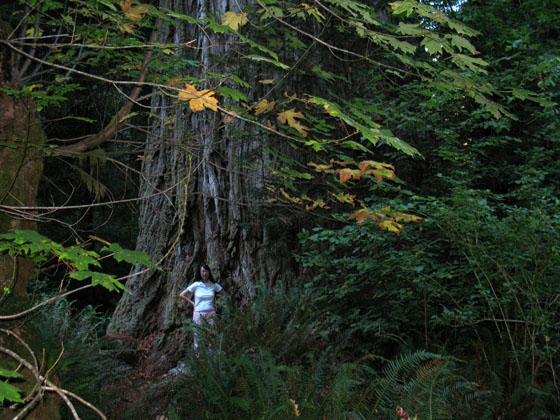
- Lost Monarch
- Interactive map of Lost Monarch
- Species: Coast redwood (Sequoia sempervirens)
- Height: 97.84 m (321.0 ft)
- Diameter: 7.92 m (26.0 ft)
- Volume of trunk: 989 m^{3} (34,900 ft^{3})

Lost Monarch is a coast redwood (Sequoia sempervirens) tree in Northern California that is 26 feet (7.9 m) in diameter at breast height (with multiple stems included), and 320 feet (98 m) in height. It is the world's fifth largest coast redwood in terms of wood volume (the Del Norte Titan was listed as the largest single-stem coast redwood tree, in part because the basal measurements of the Lost Monarch contain multiple stems).

== Discovery and location ==
Lost Monarch was discovered on May 11, 1998, by botanist Stephen C. Sillett, and naturalist Michael Taylor, and is located among other giant redwoods called "The Grove of Titans" in Jedediah Smith Redwoods State Park, although its exact location has not been revealed to the public out of concern that excessive human foot traffic may upset the ecosystem or lead to vandalism. The tree is estimated to contain 34,914 cubic feet (988.7 m^{3}) of wood volume, and is surrounded by other coastal redwoods known as some of the largest of the species. Of the surrounding redwood trees, some have names from the discoverers, such as El Viejo del Norte, Screaming Titans, Eärendil and Elwing, Stalagmight, and others.

== Epiphytes ==
Lost Monarch supports and provides a habitat for epiphytes including Polypodium scouleri. One report from 2003 estimated that Lost Monarch held about 1,000 pounds (450 kg) of P. scouleri fern mat material.

== See also ==
- List of individual trees
