= Del Norte Titan =

Third-largest known living coast redwood

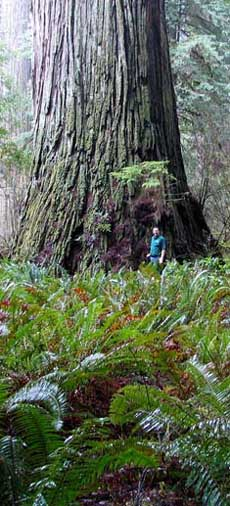
- Arborist M.D. Vaden next to the coastal redwood Del Norte Titan in the winter of 2008. The groundcover plants are western sword fern and redwood sorrel.
- Species: Coast redwood (Sequoia sempervirens)
- Height: 93.57 m (307.0 ft)
- Diameter: 7.22 m (23.7 ft)
- Volume of trunk: 1,062 m^{3} (37,500 ft^{3})

Del Norte Titan is a coast redwood (Sequoia sempervirens) tree in Del Norte County, Northern California, that was confirmed by measuring to be at least 23.7 feet (7.2 m) in diameter at breast height (DBH, measured 4.5 feet or 1.4 metres above soil grade), and 307 feet (94 m) tall. Measured by botanist Stephen Sillett, it ranks as the world's fifth largest coast redwood. One source recognizes it as the largest based on a single-stem measurement. But the source's recognition pre-dates a 2014 discovery in the redwood parks that is larger. Lost Monarch in the same park, is actually larger with more wood volume than Del Norte Titan, if basal stems are included. The fourth largest coastal redwood is in Prairie Creek Redwoods State Park called Iluvatar.

Del Norte Titan was discovered in 1998 along with other giant coast redwoods in the Grove of Titans. The grove (unofficially named) is located in Jedediah Smith Redwoods State Park. The tree is estimated to contain 37,200 cubic feet (1,050 m^{3}) of wood. Some information about the grove was published by Richard Preston.

Del Norte Titan is part of the Grove of Titans, near other large Coast Redwoods. Their exact location was kept secret by arborists until 2011, when a visitor posted their geolocation online.

== See also ==
- List of individual trees
