= Redwoods Rising =

Joint venture in northwestern California, United States

Redwoods Rising joint venture in Redwood National and State Parks
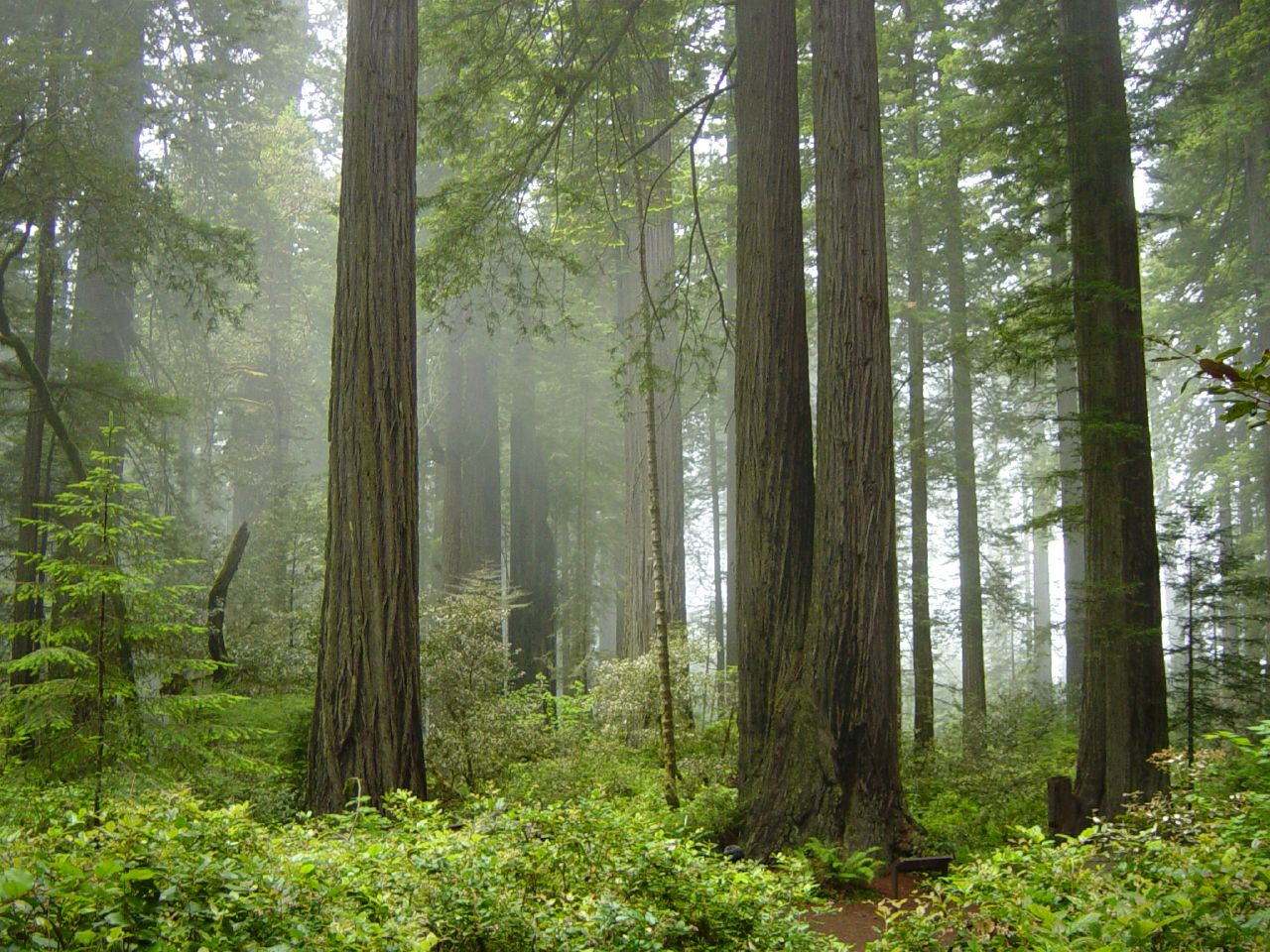
- A forest of coast redwoods in fog

- Location within California Location within the United States
- Location: Redwood National and State Parks in Humboldt County & Del Norte County, California, US
- Coordinates: 41°18′N 124°00′W
- Established: April 2018
- Website: www.savetheredwoods.org/project/redwoods-rising/

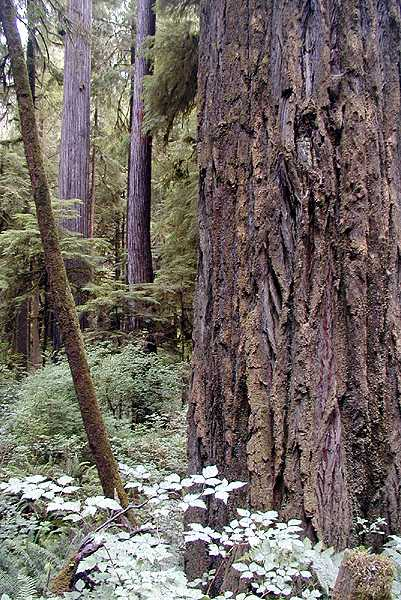
Sequoia sempervirens

Redwoods Rising is a joint venture of the Save the Redwoods League, California State Parks, and the National Park Service that works together to restore logged Coastal Redwood forests, and help remain old growth forests in Redwood National and State Parks. Redwoods Rising also works with local Native American tribes. Redwoods Rising was founded in April 2018 at an event in Prairie Creek Redwoods State Park. Redwood National and State Parks as 120,000 acres (49,000 ha) of public lands, 80,000 acres (32,000 ha) of this land were commercially logged in the past. About 96 percent of the world's old-growth coast redwood forest has been logged. The work is being done in the California Coast Ranges in North Coast of California's Redwood forests. Almost half (about 45 percent) of what remains is in the Redwood National and State Parks. The Redwoods Rising projects are also helping to restore the health of streams, also the fish and amphibians that live there. Coastal Redwoods are the tallest tree species on Earth. Coastal Redwood live only in the humid temperate rainforest of North Coast of California and Southern Oregon. Redwood National and State Parks contain land and villages belonging to the Native American groups Yurok and Tolowa. Yurok Indian Reservation is partly in the park.

== Parks ==
Parks in the Redwood National and State Parks, that Redwoods Rising works in:

- Del Norte Coast Redwoods State Park
- Jedediah Smith Redwoods State Park
- Prairie Creek Redwoods State Park

Redwoods Rising projects have been done in the Mill Creek watershed and Prairie Creek watershed.

== Goals ==
Stated goals of Redwoods Rising:

- Create a shared restoration strategy
- Enhance capacity for larger and more frequent restoration projects
- Develop dedicated and increased funding to support ecosystem restoration
- Build and expand public support for restoring, protecting, and stewarding redwood ecosystems

== See also ==
- California Department of Parks and Recreation
- National parks in California
- List of national parks of the United States
