= The Wild Trees =

2007 non-fiction book by Richard Preston

- First edition
- Author: Richard Preston
- Language: English
- Subject: Tree-climbing
- Genre: Non-fiction
- Publisher: Random House
- Publication date: 2007
- Publication place: United States
- Media type: Print (Paperback and Hardback)
- Pages: 294
- ISBN: 1400064899

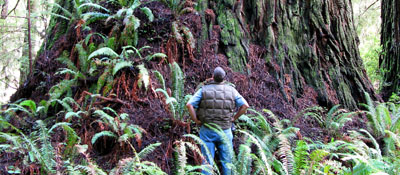
Arborist standing next to a redwood named Screaming Titans, described in a chapter of the book – The Lost Valley – within section 4: Love in Zeus. This redwood tree is located in the Grove of Titans

The Wild Trees: A Story of Passion and Daring is a non-fiction book by Richard Preston about California's coastal redwoods (Sequoia sempervirens) and the recreational climbers who climbed them. It is a narrative-style collection of stories from climbers who pioneered redwood climbing, including botanist Steve Sillett, lichenologist Marie Antoine, and Michael Taylor. They inadvertently discovered a thriving ecosystem hidden among the tree tops, 60–90 meters (200–300 ft) above, of redwood lattices, berry bushes, bonsai trees, epiphytes, lichens, voles, and salamanders.

The book was #83 on Amazon's Best Books of the Year. It was illustrated by Andrew Joslin.

The Wild Trees introduces several characters and provides backgrounds for them, as far back as their childhoods. Throughout the book, information about trees, forests and logging is woven into the story.

Several of the largest and tallest known redwoods are introduced, including descriptions. Details are provided about how these trees are climbed, explored and studied, although many of their specific locations are not given.

== See also ==
- Hyperion
