= Mill Creek (Del Norte County, California) =

River in California, United States

Mill Creek (California)
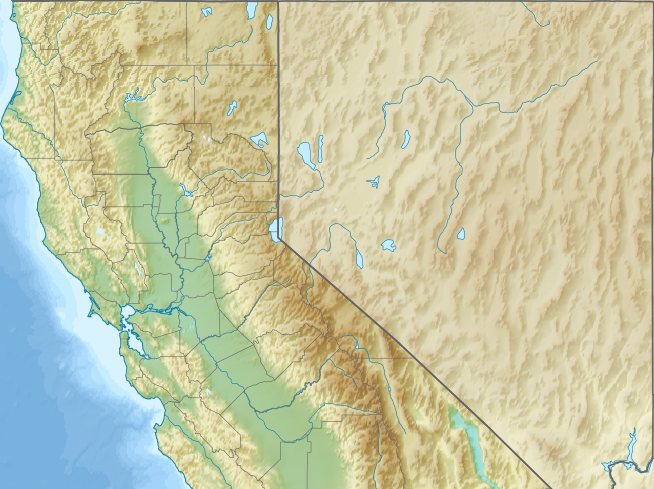
- Location within Northern California Location within the United States

Location
- Country: United States
- State: California

Physical characteristics
- Source
  - location: Del Norte Coast Redwoods State Park, Del Norte County
  - coordinates: 41.791694°N 124.084472°W
- Mouth: Smith River, California
  - location: near Jedediah Smith Campground, Del Norte County
  - coordinates: 41.791694°N 124.084472°W
- Governing body: California Department of Parks and Recreation, National Park Service

Mill Creek is a major tributary to the Smith River in Del Norte County in extreme northwestern California, on the West Coast of the United States. Much of Mill Creek flows through the Del Norte Coast Redwoods State Park. Mill Creek watershed is south of the Smith River. Redwoods Rising a joint venture of the Save the Redwoods League, California State Parks, and the National Park Service has been working since 2018 to restore logged Coastal Redwood trees in the Mill Creek watershed. Mill creek is also fed from the West Branch of the Mill Creek and East Fork of the Mill Creek. Bummer Lake Creek feeds the East Fork of the Mill Creek. Mill Creek and its tributaries flow through some of the largest old-growth coast redwood forests.
