= Redwood National and State Parks =

Group of national and state parks in California, United States

- IUCN category V (protected landscape/seascape)
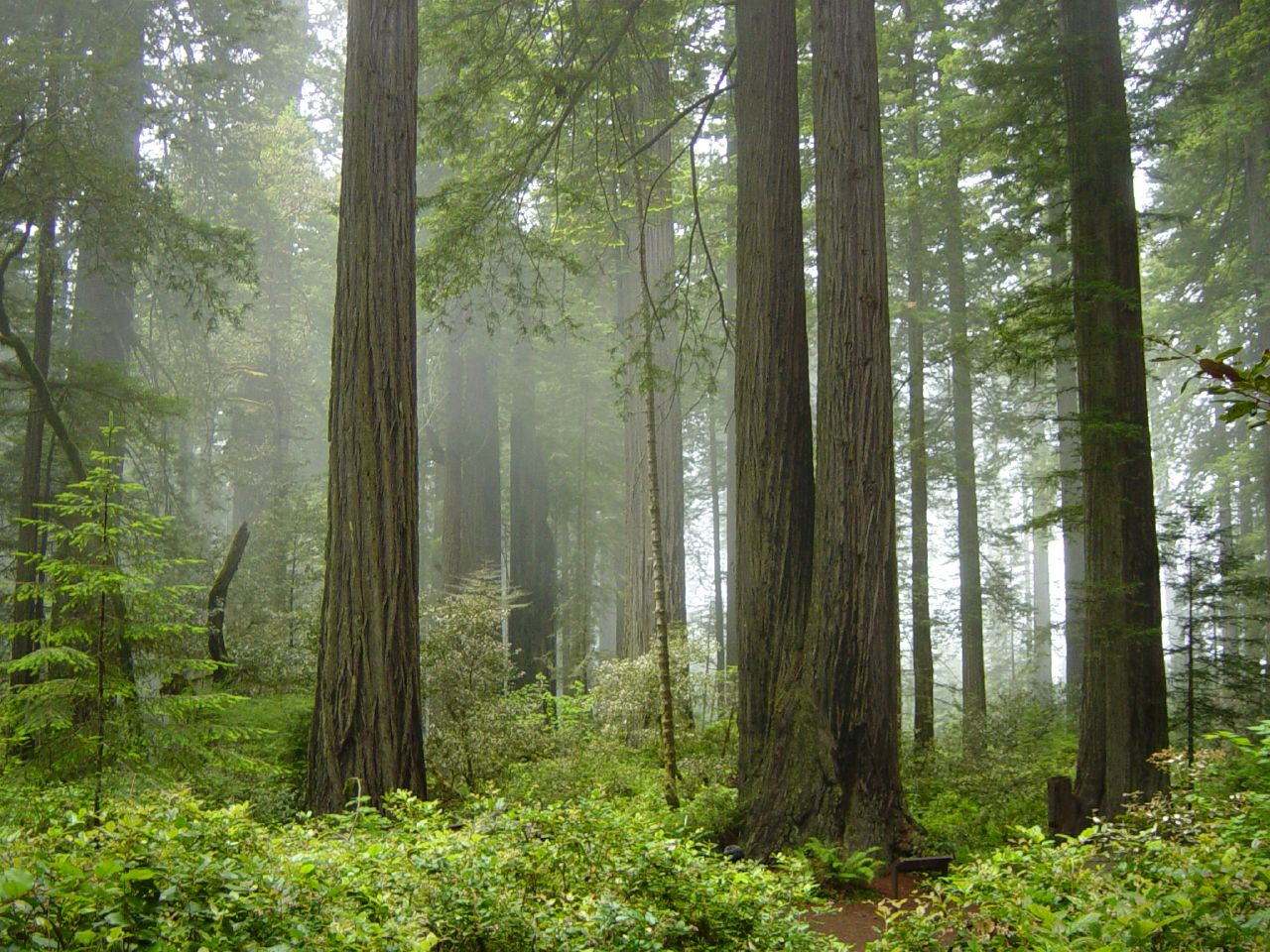
- A forest of coast redwoods in fog
- Interactive map of Redwood National and State Parks
- Location: Humboldt County and Del Norte County, California, US
- Nearest city: Crescent City
- Coordinates: 41°18′N 124°00′W
- Area: 139,091 acres (56,288 ha; 562.88 km^{2}; 217.330 mi^{2})
- Established: October 2, 1968
- Visitors: 458,400 (in 2022)
- Governing body: National Park Service and California Department of Parks and Recreation
- Website: nps.gov/redw/index.htm

UNESCO World Heritage Site
- Criteria: Natural: (vii), (ix)
- Reference: 134
- Inscription: 1980 (4th Session)

The Redwood National and State Parks (RNSP) are a complex of one United States national park and three California state parks located along the coast of northern California. The combined RNSP contain Redwood National Park, Del Norte Coast Redwoods State Park, Jedediah Smith Redwoods State Park, and Prairie Creek Redwoods State Park. The parks' 139,000 acres (217 mi^{2}; 560 km^{2}) preserve 45 percent of all remaining old-growth coast redwood forests.

Located in Del Norte and Humboldt counties, the four parks protect the endangered coast redwood (Sequoia sempervirens)—the tallest, among the oldest, and one of the most massive tree species on Earth—which thrives in the humid temperate rainforest. The park region is highly seismically active and prone to tsunamis. The parks preserve 37 miles (60 km) of pristine coastline, indigenous flora, fauna, grassland prairie, cultural resources, waterways, as well as threatened animal species, such as the Chinook salmon, northern spotted owl, and Steller's sea lion.

Redwood forest originally covered more than 8,100 km^{2} (3,100 sq mi) of the California coast, and the region of today's parks largely remained wild until after 1850. The Gold Rush and attendant timber business unleashed a torrent of activity, adversely affecting the indigenous peoples of the area and supplying lumber to the West Coast. Decades of unrestricted clear-cut logging ensued, followed by ardent conservation efforts. In the 1920s, the Save the Redwoods League helped create Prairie Creek, Del Norte Coast, and Jedediah Smith Redwoods State Parks, among others. After lobbying from the league and the Sierra Club, Congress created Redwood National Park in 1968 and expanded it in 1978. In 1994, the National Park Service (NPS) and the California Department of Parks and Recreation combined Redwood National Park with the three abutting Redwoods State Parks into a single administrative unit. Modern RNSP management seeks to protect and restore the coast redwood forests to their condition before 1850, including by controlled burning.

In recognition of the rare ecosystem and cultural history found in the parks, the United Nations designated them a World Heritage Site in 1980. Local tribes declared an Indigenous Marine Stewardship Area in 2023, protecting the parks region, the coastline, and coastal waters. While some areas of the adjoining state parks charge fees, Redwood National Park admission is free and visitors may camp, hike, bike, and ride horseback along about 200 miles (320 km) of park system trails.

== History ==
=== Native Americans ===
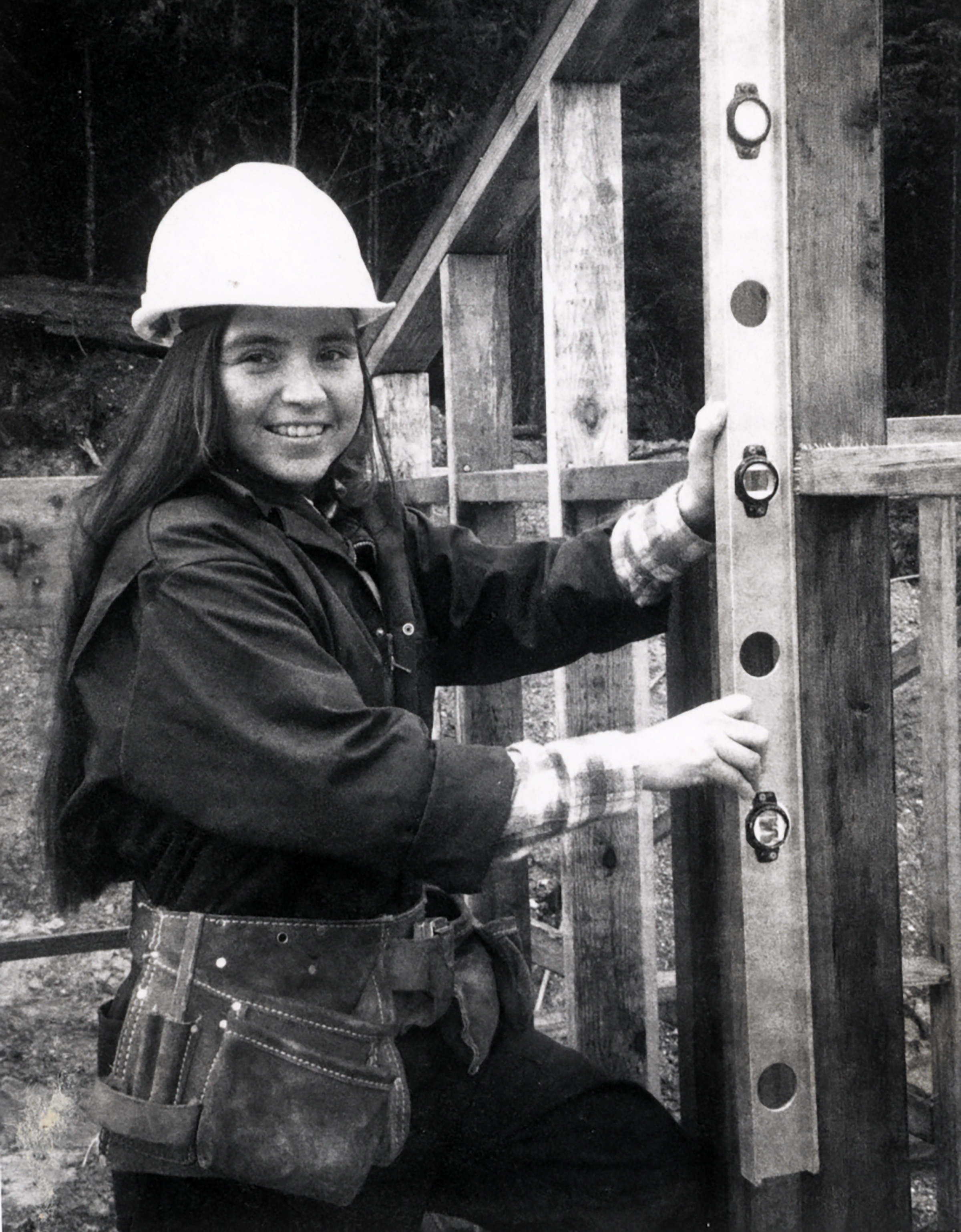
A Tolowa woman working park maintenance in 1982

Modern-day Native American nations such as the Yurok, Tolowa, Karuk, Chilula, and Wiyot have historical ties to the region, which has had various indigenous occupants for millennia. Describing "a diversity in an area that size that probably has never been equaled anywhere else in the world", historian David Stannard accounts for more than thirty native nations that lived in northwestern California. Scholar Gail L. Jenner estimates that "at least fifteen" tribal groups inhabited the coastline.

The Yurok, Chilula, and Tolowa were the most connected to the current parks' areas. Based on an 1852 census, anthropologist Alfred Kroeber estimated that the Yurok population in that year was around 2,500. Historian Ed Bearss described the Yurok as the most populous in the area, estimating that there were around 55 villages. Until the 1860s, the Chilula lived in the middle region of the Redwood Creek valley in close company with the redwood trees. They primarily settled along Redwood Creek between the coast and Minor Creek, California, and in summer they would range into and camp in the Bald Hills. The Tolowa were located near the Smith River, and on lands that are now part of Jedediah Smith State Park, an area which 21st century excavation found has been inhabited for at least 8,500 years.

Native Americans residing within the park areas relied on redwood trees as a construction material, and some featured the trees in their mythology, including the Chilula, who viewed the trees as gifts from a creator. The tribes harvested coast redwoods and processed them into planks, using them as building material for boats, houses, and small villages. To construct buildings, the planks would be erected side by side in a narrow trench, with the upper portions lashed with willow or hazel and held by notches cut into the supporting roof beams. Redwood boards were used to form a two- or three-pitch roof.

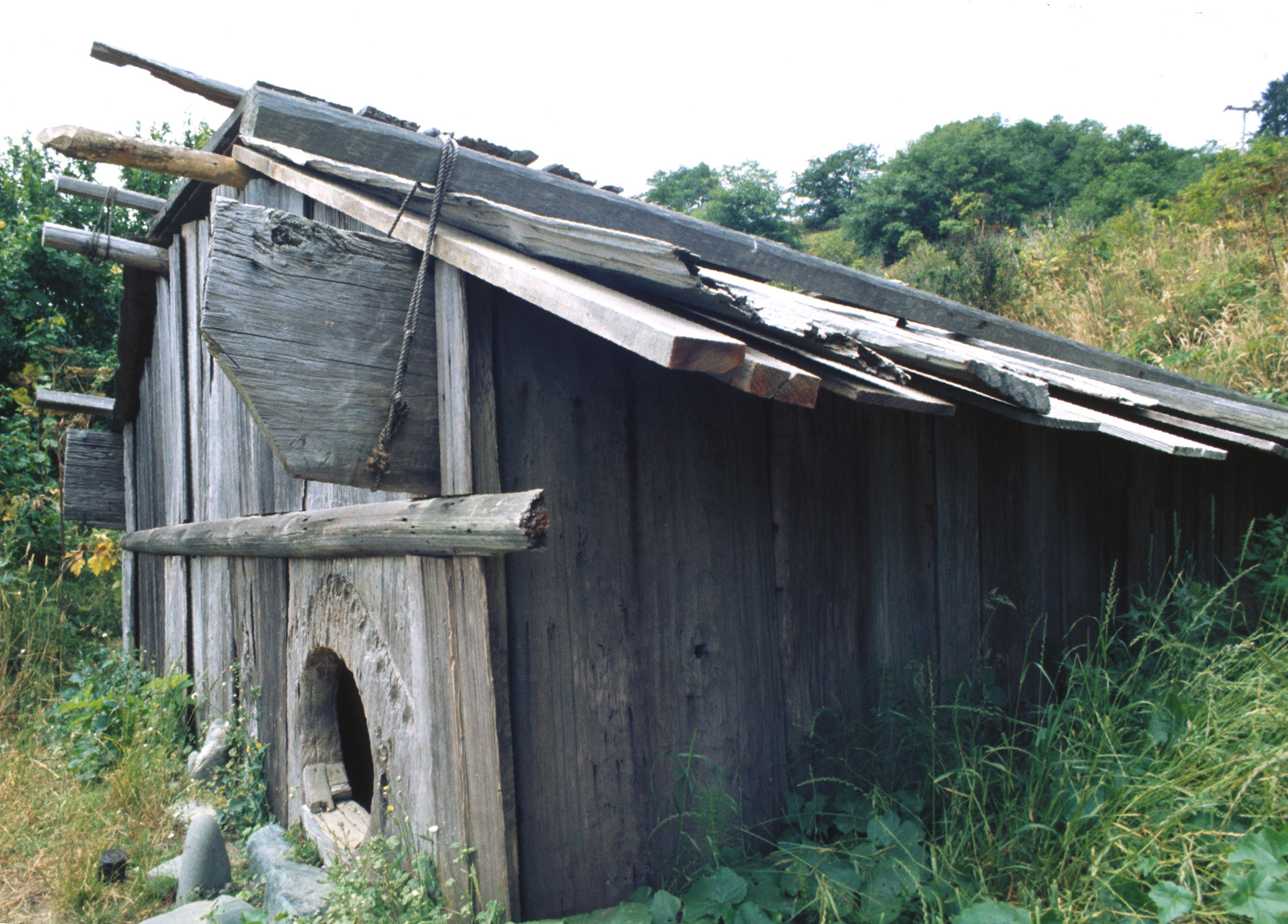
Reconstructed Yurok plankhouse made of redwood boards

=== Arrival of European Americans ===
Historians believe that the first Europeans to visit land near what is now the parks were members of the Cabrillo expedition led by Bartolomé Ferrer. In 1543, Ferrer's ship made landfall at Cape Mendocino and may have reached waters off Oregon as far north as the 43rd parallel. Hubert Howe Bancroft disagreed, believing that Ferrer's ship did not travel so far north. Explorers including Francis Drake sailed past the foggy, rocky coast, but generally did not set anchor until 1775, when Bruno de Heceta and Juan Francisco de la Bodega y Quadra of Spain spent about ten days at the Yurok village of Tsurai south of the parks. George Vancouver and Francisco de Eliza followed in 1793. American fur trading ships under contract to Russians stopped at Tsurai during the early 19th century.

Prior to Jedediah Smith in 1828, no other explorer of European descent is known to have explored the interior of the Northern California coastal region. Smith and nineteen companions left San Jose, California, and explored what are now called the Trinity, Smith, and Klamath rivers, passing through coast redwood forests and trading with Native American groups. They reached the coast near Requa, parts of which are within the parks' boundaries.

The California Gold Rush of 1848 brought hundreds of thousands of Europeans and Americans to California, and the discovery of gold along the Trinity River in 1850 brought many of them to the region of the parks. This quickly led to conflicts wherein native peoples were displaced, raped, enslaved, and massacred. By 1895, only one third of the Yurok in one group of villages remained; by 1919, virtually all members of the Chilula tribe had either died or been assimilated into other tribes. The Tolowa—whose numbers Bearss estimates at "well under 1,000" by the 1850s—had a population of about 120 in 1910, having been nearly extinguished in massacres by settlers between 1853 and 1855.

Redwood logging followed gold mining, and most mining companies became lumber interests. Redwood has a straight grain, making planks easy to cut. Because redwood can defy the weather and does not warp, it became a valuable commodity. Jenner says a good team of two men could saw through a redwood tree at about a foot per hour with a crosscut saw, their preferred tool until after World War II. Because wheeled vehicles could not travel the landscape, teams of six or twelve oxen transported logs to logging roads. Rivers or railroads took them to the region's lumber mills. After the 1881 invention of the steam donkey and later its successor the bull donkey, the need to fell intervening trees so the donkeys could work spawned the practice called clearcutting. Caterpillar tractors began to compete with manual labor in the late 1920s.

=== State park preservation ===
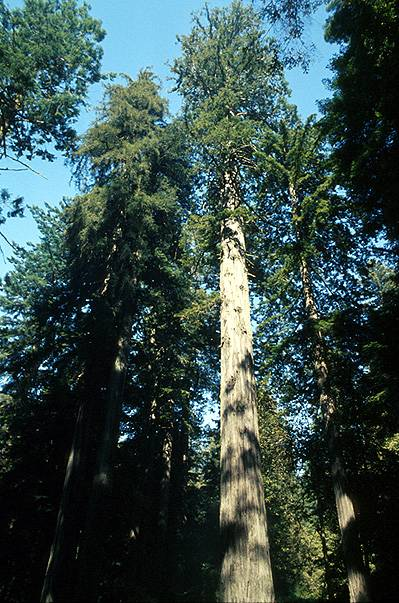
The coast redwood is the tallest tree species on Earth.

After extensive logging, conservationists and concerned citizens began to seek ways to preserve remaining trees, which they saw being logged at an alarming rate. Stumbling blocks slowed conservation: objections and some innovations came from the logging industry, (Note: Two highlights in the long battle: • Pacific Lumber (PL) introduced "selective cutting" and "sustained yield", policies that fell to a hostile takeover in 1985. PL declared bankruptcy in 2007. Today PL is Mendocino Redwood Company, which restored management favorable to preservation. • Logging workers united in 1977. A 25-truck convoy featuring logging equipment crossed the country to deliver President Jimmy Carter a nine-ton peanut carved from old-growth redwood. The president refused the gift, and the Orick Peanut was returned to Orick, a logging town adjacent to the newly expanded park that saw substantial economic decline in the following decades.) construction of the Redwood Highway brought roadside attractions and more visitors to the trees, Congress failed to act, (Note: In 1911, US Representative John E. Raker of California introduced legislation for the creation of a redwood national park, but Congress took no action.) and voracious demand for lumber came with the post–World War II construction boom. (Note: According to the parks' official website: "It was the post World War II housing and economic boom caused the majority of old-growth redwoods to be clear cut. In just a few decades, hundreds of thousands of acres of old-growth redwoods on private lands were logged. By the 1960s, industrial logging had removed almost ninety percent of all the original redwoods.")

Organizations formed to preserve the surviving trees: concerned about the sequoia of Yosemite, John Muir cofounded the Sierra Club in 1892. The Sempervirens Club was cofounded in 1900 by artist Andrew P. Hill who lobbied the media, and saw the oldest state park created along with the California state park system. In 1916, politician William Kent purchased land outright and helped to write the bill founding the National Park Service (NPS). In 1918, John Merriam and other members of the Boone and Crockett Club founded the Save the Redwoods League. The league bought land and donated funds for land purchases. Historian Susan Schrepfer writes that, in a sixty-year-long marathon, the Save the Redwoods League and the Sierra Club were racing the logging companies for the old trees.

At first, in 1919, with Congress showing interest but no appropriations, NPS director Stephen Mather formed the NPS system with private wealth—he and his wealthy friends purchased parkland with their own money. Balancing opponents and supporters, the Save the Redwoods League saw their compromise bill pass in 1923, allowing condemnation for park acquisition with state oversight. In 1925, the league backed a bill that would authorize a statewide survey by a landscape architect and permit land acquisition and condemnation for parks. In 1926, the league retained Frederick Law Olmsted to make that survey. The league added to their bill a proposed state constitutional amendment authorizing up to $6 million ($109 million in 2025) in bonds to equally match private donations for state land purchases. After sustaining a governor's veto in 1925, the league broadened its efforts to include the whole state, mounted a publicity campaign, and gained the support of the Los Angeles Times. A new governor signed the parks bill into law in 1927, a bond issue was approved in the 1928 election.

In 1927, Olmsted's survey was complete and concluded that only three percent of the state's redwoods could be preserved. He recommended four redwood areas for parks, including three areas that became Prairie Creek Redwoods, Del Norte Coast Redwoods, and Jedediah Smith Redwoods State Parks. A fourth became Humboldt Redwoods State Park, by far the largest of the individual Redwoods State Parks, but not in the Redwood National and State Parks system. Now armed with matching funds after 1928, the league bought more land and added to these parks as conditions allowed.

=== National park ===
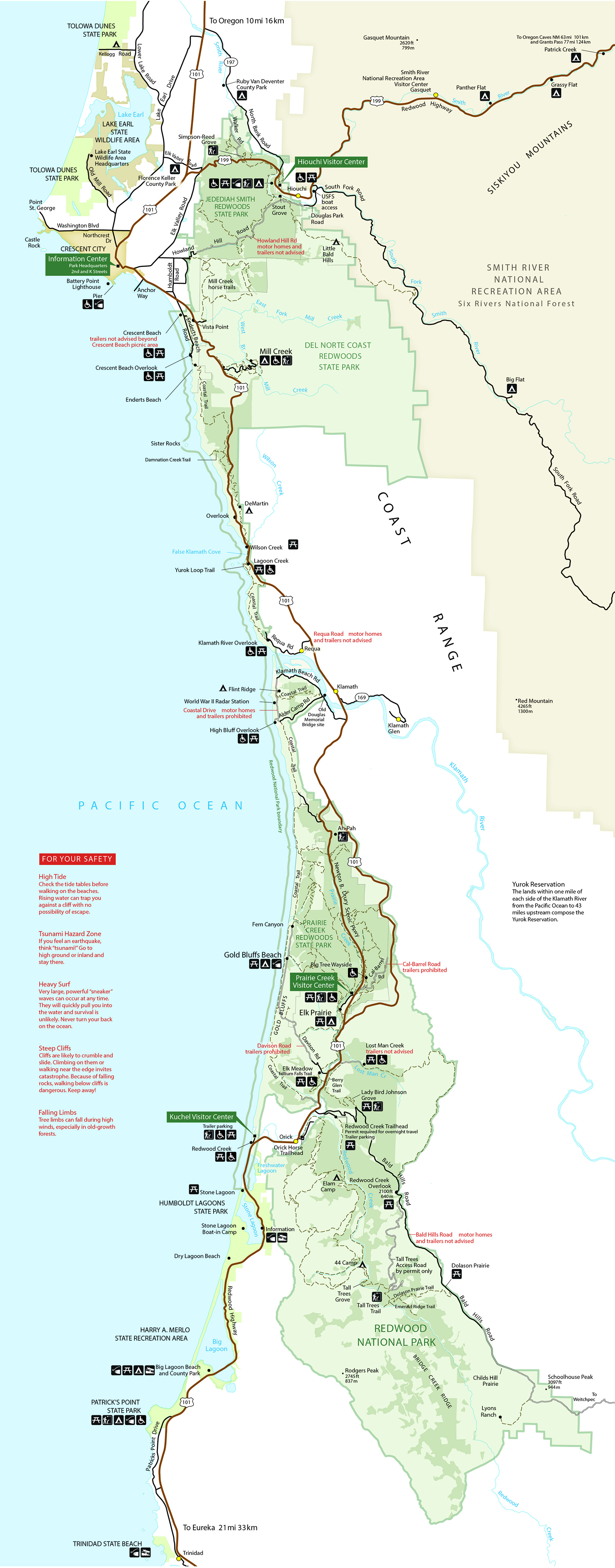
A map of Redwood National and State Parks (2020)

The NPS proposed a redwoods national park in 1938. The Save the Redwoods League opposed it, highlighting a division between preservationists who preferred unembellished nature and a segment of the park service who wished to provide recreation and playgrounds for the public. Both the league and the Sierra Club wanted a redwoods national park by the 1960s, but the club and the league supported different locations. The club and the league were antagonists during the 1960s, often on opposite sides of national park arguments, until 1971 when the league backed a club position, and the late 1970s when the league became a club member.

The Sierra Club wanted the largest possible park and usually sought help from the federal government. More cautious, the Save the Redwoods League tended to accommodate industry and support the state of California. When the agency had no funds in 1963, the National Geographic Society funded an NPS survey of the redwoods. In 1964, NPS released its ideas for three different sized redwood national parks. In 1964, Congress passed the Land and Water Conservation Fund to allow federal funds to purchase parkland.

Describing a reason for the club's success, Willard Pratt of the Arcata lumber company wrote, "The Sierra Club demonstrated a basic political fact of life: Opposition to particular preservation proposals usually is local while support is national. If decision making can be placed at the national level, preservation usually can win".

Initially opposing the park in the 1960s, the Arcata, Georgia-Pacific, and Miller lumber businesses operated up to the boundaries being discussed. In 1965, five logging companies formally objected to any redwood national park. Schrepfer writes that the final bill divided the impact between the lumber companies, between California counties, and tried to appeal to both the league and the club. Schrepfer says that in large part, the bill was framed on the loggers' terms. After intense lobbying of Congress, the bill creating Redwood National Park was signed by President Lyndon B. Johnson in October 1968.

The Save the Redwoods League donated parcels in 1974 and 1976. The club found the Olmsted plan of delicately choosing sites was the wrong approach to defend against tractor clearcutting. In 1977, the club said that only ridge-to-ridge land acquisition around a water channel could preserve a watershed and thus the trees. Amidst both local support of environmentalists and opposition from local loggers and logging companies, 48,000 acres (190 km^{2}; 75 mi^{2}) were added to Redwood National Park in an expansion signed by President Jimmy Carter in 1978. The purchase included lands that had already been logged, and the NPS was charged with restoring the land and reducing soil erosion. At hundreds of millions of dollars, it was the most expensive land purchase ever approved by Congress. By 1979, the league had preserved 150,000 acres (610 km^{2}; 230 mi^{2}), nearly twice the area that the federal government was able to save with park legislation.

=== Further recognition ===
The United Nations designated the Redwood National and State Parks a World Heritage Site in 1980. The evaluation committee noted cooperative management and ongoing research in the parks by Cal Poly Humboldt University and other partners. The parks are within the California Coast Ranges and their resources are considered irreplaceable. In 1983, the parks were designated an International Biosphere Reserve. In 2017, the US withdrew them along with more than a dozen other reserves from the World Network of Biosphere Reserves.

In 2023, following the lead of First Nations in Canada and Aboriginal people in Australia, three federally recognized indigenous tribes—the Resighini Rancheria of the Yurok People, Tolowa Dee-niʼ Nation, and Cher-Ae Heights Indian Community of the Trinidad Rancheria—announced that as sovereign governments they have protected the Yurok-Tolowa-Dee-niʼ Indigenous Marine Stewardship Area. The effort protected territorial ocean waters and coastline reaching from Oregon to just south of Trinidad, California, and contributed to the California 30x30 plan to conserve 30% of the state's land and coastal water by 2030. The tribes invited cooperation with US agencies and other indigenous nations.

== Park management ==
Redwood National Park is directly managed by the NPS from its office in Crescent City, California. The three state parks are overseen by the California Department of Parks and Recreation. The park management coordinates with tribal leaders, as the parks contain land and village sites belonging to groups including the Yurok and Tolowa. NPS manages about 1,400 acres (5.7 km^{2}) of federal park land and waters that lie within the Yurok Indian Reservation.

Redwood National Park management oversees many other details aside from the redwoods and organic species that reside within the park boundaries. They regulate areas that are off limits to motor vehicles, boats, drones, horses, pets and even bicycles. In addition, park management establishes limitations on camping, campfires, food storage and backcountry use, as well as necessary permits.

When it opened in 1969, Redwood National Park had six permanent employees. As of 2023, the combined RNSP had 96 permanent and 52 temporary staff members. Early park managers prioritized restoring existing structures, rehabilitating the watershed, and developing wildlife management plans. Until 1980, managers assumed that the three state parks, which are contained within the boundaries of the national park, would be donated to the NPS. The donation did not happen, and NPS and the state signed a memorandum of understanding in 1994 governing joint management, and agreeing to the name "Redwood National and State Parks". As of 2021, the combined RNSP had 1,185,000 annual visitors.

== Geology ==
Both coastline and the mountains of the California Coast Ranges can be found within park boundaries. The majority of the rocks in the parks are part of the Franciscan assemblage. Assemblage metamorphic and sedimentary rocks of the Jurassic and Cretaceous periods, along with marine and alluvial sedimentary deposits of the Tertiary and Quaternary periods, are underneath the Redwood Creek basin. These sedimentary rocks are primarily sandstone, siltstone, and shale, with lesser amounts of chert, greenstone, and metamorphic rocks.

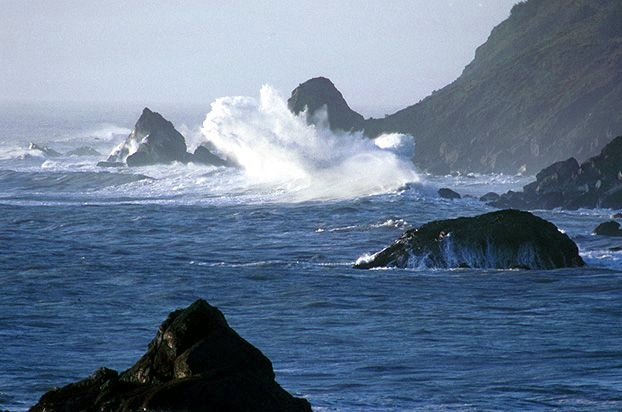
Coastline area

The parks are located in the most seismically active area in the country. Frequent minor earthquakes in the park and offshore under the Pacific Ocean have resulted in shifting river channels, landslides, and erosion of seaside cliffs. The North American, Pacific, and Gorda Plates are tectonic plates that all meet at the Mendocino triple junction, about 100 miles (160 km) southwest of the parks. During the 1990s, more than nine magnitude 6.0 earthquakes occurred along this fault zone. More recently, a 6.4 magnitude quake in 2022 with a hypocenter off the coast caused two deaths. Visitors' centers closed but the parks remained open. The area is the most tsunami-prone in the continental US, and visitors to the seacoast are told to seek higher ground immediately after any significant earthquake. The parks' altitude ranges from below sea level up to 837 meters (2,746 ft) at Rodgers Peak.

== Climate ==
The Redwood National and State Parks have a warm-summer Mediterranean climate (Köppen: Csb). (Note: See temperature and precipitation data in the table below and the Köppen-Geiger criteria.) They receive abundant rain during most of the year, with a peak in winter, a decrease in June and September, and two dry summer months (July and August).

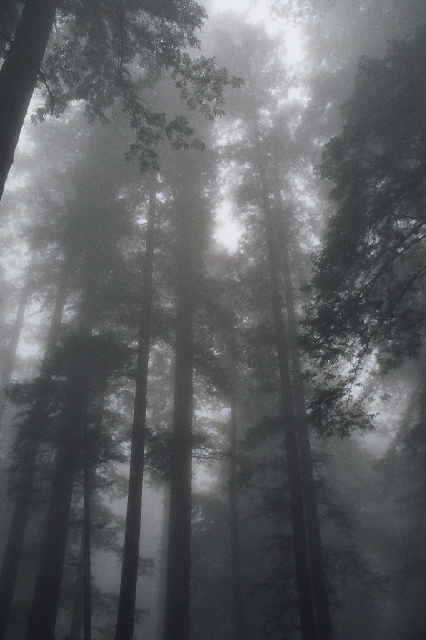
Fog is persistent during the summer.

The parks are part of a temperate rainforest that runs along the western United States coast. The nearby Pacific Ocean has major effects on the climate in the parks. Temperatures near the coast mostly remain between 40 and 60 degrees Fahrenheit (4–15 °C) all year. Redwoods tend to grow in this area of steadily temperate climate, though most grow at least a mile or two (1.5–3 km) from the coast to avoid the saltier air, and they never grow more than 50 miles (80 km) from it. In this humid coastal zone, the trees receive moisture from both heavy winter rains and persistent summer fog. The presence and consistency of the summer fog is actually more important to overall health of the trees than the precipitation. This fact is borne out in precipitation totals of around 71 inches (180 cm) annually, with healthy redwood forests throughout the areas of less precipitation because excessive needs for water are mitigated by the ever-present summer fog and the cooler temperatures it ensures. The rare snow falls mostly on the hills and mountains in and adjacent to the park.

Parts of the parks are threatened by climate change. Increasing average temperatures have led to reduced water quality, affecting the fish and other fauna, and rising sea levels threaten to damage park structures near the coast. The redwoods benefit from higher carbon levels and are resilient against temperature changes. Scientists fear climate change is likely to shift the range in which coast redwoods live to outside protected areas, and many have done research on assisted migration. (Note: Studies on assisted migration were conducted by groups including the USFS, the Save the Redwoods League, and the Canadian government.)

Climate data for Crescent City 3 NNW, CA (Eureka, California Office)
Month	Jan	Feb	Mar	Apr	May	Jun	Jul	Aug	Sep	Oct	Nov	Dec	Year
Record high °F (°C)	72 (22)	77 (25)	75 (24)	77 (25)	86 (30)	85 (29)	81 (27)	80 (27)	87 (31)	93 (34)	74 (23)	68 (20)	93 (34)
Mean daily maximum °F (°C)	54.3 (12.4)	55.2 (12.9)	56.1 (13.4)	57.9 (14.4)	60.8 (16.0)	63.1 (17.3)	65.4 (18.6)	66.1 (18.9)	65.9 (18.8)	62.1 (16.7)	56.6 (13.7)	53.1 (11.7)	59.7 (15.4)
Mean daily minimum °F (°C)	40.0 (4.4)	40.2 (4.6)	41.1 (5.1)	43.2 (6.2)	45.7 (7.6)	48.1 (8.9)	51.1 (10.6)	51.6 (10.9)	48.4 (9.1)	45.5 (7.5)	41.6 (5.3)	39.2 (4.0)	44.6 (7.0)
Record low °F (°C)	24 (−4)	25 (−4)	28 (−2)	30 (−1)	32 (0)	32 (0)	36 (2)	40 (4)	37 (3)	29 (−2)	27 (−3)	20 (−7)	20 (−7)
Average precipitation inches (mm)	11.51 (292)	8.96 (228)	9.84 (250)	6.76 (172)	3.23 (82)	1.78 (45)	0.19 (4.8)	0.42 (11)	1.26 (32)	4.67 (119)	9.46 (240)	13.37 (340)	71.45 (1,815)
Average snowfall inches (cm)	0.0 (0.0)	0.0 (0.0)	0.0 (0.0)	0.0 (0.0)	0.0 (0.0)	0.0 (0.0)	0.0 (0.0)	0.0 (0.0)	0.0 (0.0)	0.0 (0.0)	0.0 (0.0)	0.0 (0.0)	0 (0)
Average precipitation days (≥ 0.01 in)	16	15	17	13	8	6	2	3	4	9	16	17	132
Source 1: NOAA (normals, 1991–2020)
Source 2: National Weather Service Forecast Office Eureka, California (records, precipitation days, snowfall 1991–2020)

== Ecology ==
The Redwood National and State Parks conserve an area which contains the largest contiguous old-growth coast redwood forest as well as habitats for endangered species.

=== Coast redwood ===
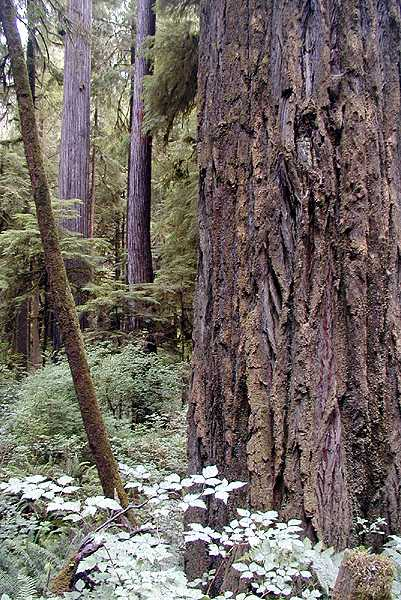
Sequoia sempervirens

Discovered in Redwood National Park in 2006 in an unpublished location, (Note: Guinness World Records says "its precise location is kept a closely guarded secret to try and protect it.") the tallest living tree is the coast redwood tree (Sequoia sempervirens) named Hyperion, at 380 feet (120 m). It is followed by Helios at 377 feet (115 m), and Icarus at 371 feet (113 m), both also in Redwood National Park. For many years thought to be the tallest, one specimen named simply "Tall Tree" in Prairie Creek Redwoods State Park was measured at 367.8 feet (112.1 m). "So many people have stood on the base of the tree that the ground is hard packed", said Professor Stephen C. Sillett of Cal Poly Humboldt university in the 1990s. The top 10 feet (3.0 m) of the tree died in the 1970s and fell off in the 1990s. In 2022, after documenting damage caused by visitors to the tallest living tree, NPS announced a penalty for those who approach it of up to a $5,000 fine ($5,501 in 2025) and six months in jail, and it shows visitors instead to views of other trees.

Mature coast redwoods live an average of 500–700 years; a few are documented to be 2,000 years old. As of 1990, a stand in nearby Humboldt Redwoods State Park had the greatest biomass ever recorded. Redwood trees develop enormous limbs that accumulate deep organic soils from which new tree-sized redwood trunks emerge and in which plants called epiphytes can grow. Mats of epiphytic ferns well above ground are home to invertebrates, mollusks, earthworms, and salamanders.

Redwoods prefer sheltered slopes, and they thrive on moist flat ground along rivers below 1,000 feet (300 m) in elevation. Coastal fog provides about 40 percent of their annual water intake. Redwoods have existed along the coast of northern California for at least 20 million years and are related to tree species that existed 160 million years ago in the Jurassic era. About 96 percent of the world's old-growth coast redwood forest has been logged, and almost half (45 percent) of what remains is in the RNSP. The parks protect 38,982 acres (157.75 km^{2}) of old-growth forest, almost equally divided between federal and state management. The International Union for Conservation of Nature named the coast redwood an endangered species in 2011.

=== Other flora ===
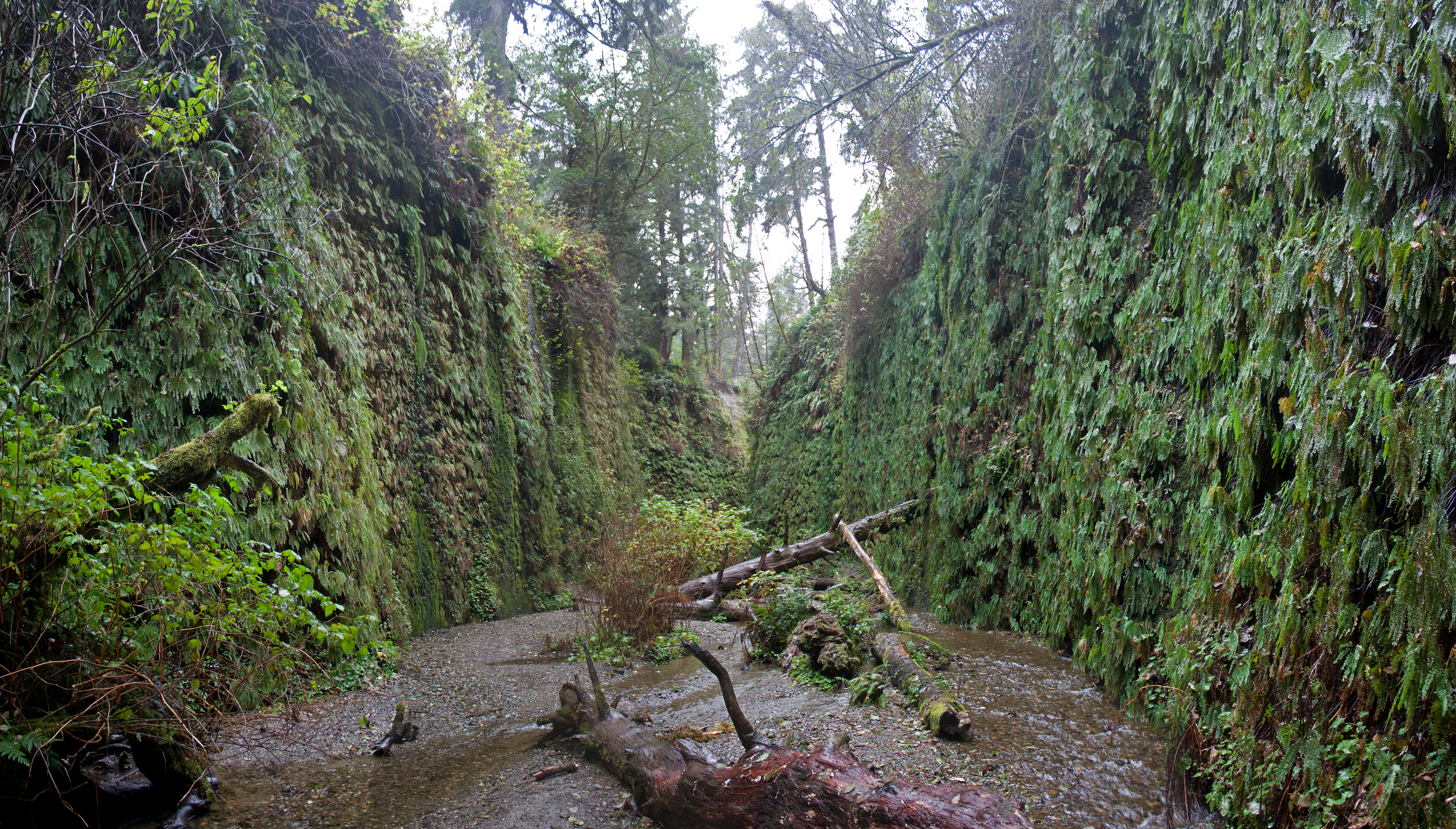
Fern Canyon in Prairie Creek Redwoods State Park

Coast redwood tends to dominate in places it likes but often can be found together with also-fast-growing coast Douglas-fir trees. Closer to the ocean, red alder grow in place of the salt-water intolerant redwood. The tallest known Sitka spruce grows in the parks. Sitka spruce are plentiful along the coast, better adapted to salty air than other species. Other associated trees are the tanoak, Pacific madrone, bigleaf maple, and California laurel.

Huckleberry and snowberry are part of the forest understory. The California rhododendron and azalea are flowering shrubs common in the parks. Plants such as the sword fern and redwood sorrel are prolific.

In Prairie Creek Redwoods State Park, Fern Canyon is a well-known ravine 50 feet (15 m) deep, with walls completely covered in ferns—California maidenhair, deer fern, California polypody, licorice fern, and western swordfern. The ancestors of some of these ferns reach back 325 million years.

=== Fauna ===
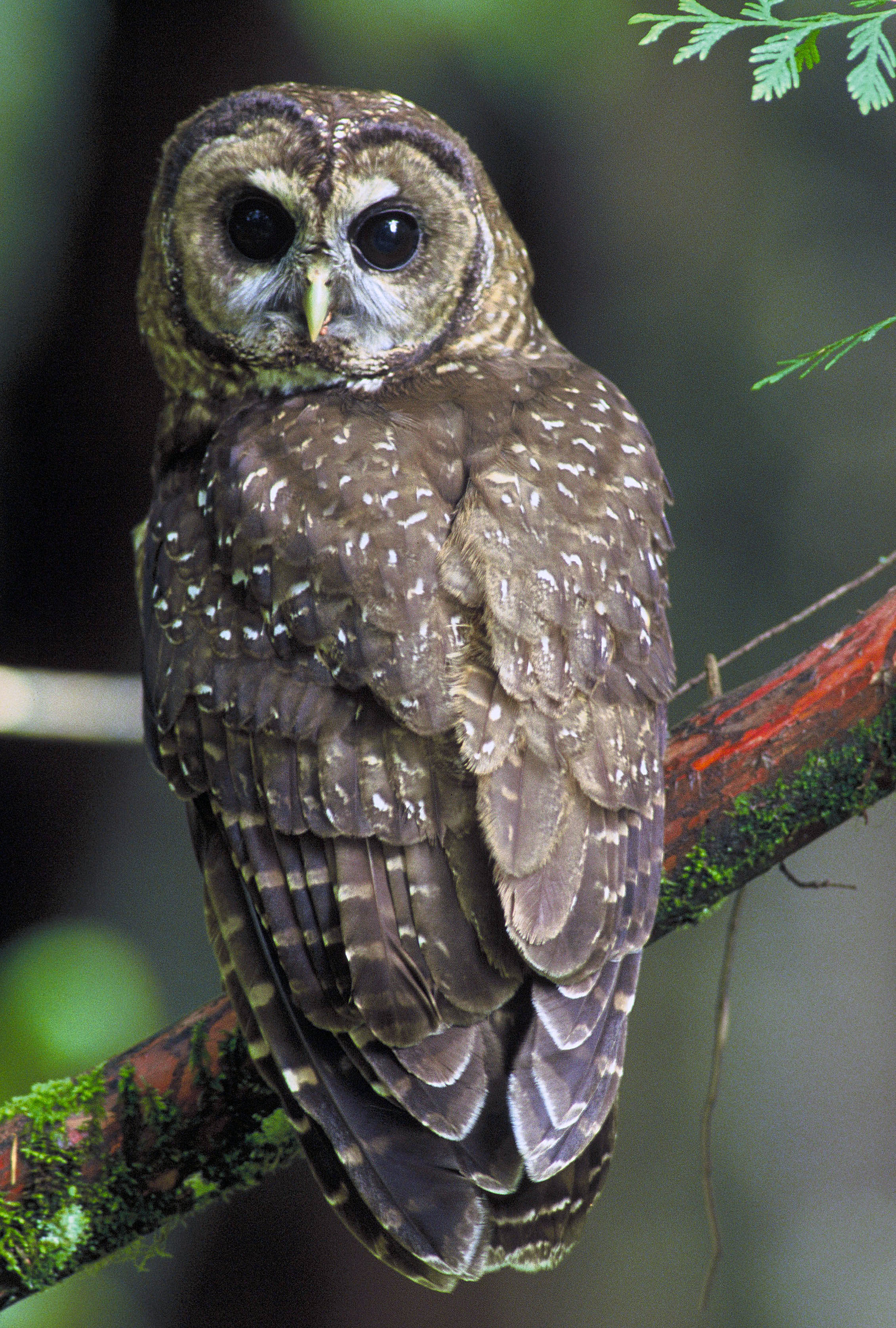
The northern spotted owl (Strix occidentalis caurina) is a threatened species known to exist in the parks.

Various ecosystems exist within the parks—seacoast, river, prairie, and densely forested zones—offering refuge to numerous rare and endangered species. About 66 species of land mammals have been documented, including the black bear, coyote, cougar, bobcat, beaver, river otter, and black-tailed deer. Roosevelt elk are the most readily observed of the large mammals in the park. Successful herds, brought back from the verge of extinction in the region, are now common in park areas. Different species of bats, such as the big brown bat, and other smaller mammals including minks, martens, red squirrels, northern flying squirrels, shrews, moles, brush rabbit, gophers, and raccoons live in the parks, although small mammals are infrequently seen.

Inhabiting or ranging into the park are 28 species that are federally recognized as endangered, threatened, or candidates for protection; about a third of that number can be regularly seen in the parks. The bald eagle, which usually nests near a water source, is listed as a state of California endangered species. The Chinook salmon—historically an essential food for indigenous residents—northern spotted owl, and Steller sea lion are some of the other animal species that are threatened. The tidewater goby is a federally listed endangered species that lives near the Pacific coastline that were extirpated from the parks in 1968 when shoreline alterations affected the water's salinity. The candlefish soon followed in the 1970s. Sea otters were extirpated in the parks at the turn of the 20th century but river otters remain. Also endangered, the marbled murrelet can nest high on redwood branches.

Along the coastline, California sea lions, Steller sea lions and harbor seals live near the shore and on seastacks, rocky outcroppings forming small islands just off the coast. Dolphins and Pacific gray whales are occasionally seen offshore. Brown pelicans and three species of cormorants are mainly found on cliffs along the coast and on seastacks, while sandpipers and three species of gulls inhabit the seacoast and inland areas. Inland, freshwater-dependent birds such as the common merganser, osprey, red-tailed hawk, herons, and jays are a few of the bird species that have been documented. Approximately 280 bird species, or about one third of those found in the US, have been documented within park boundaries.

Reptiles like four species of sea turtle can be found offshore and sometimes on beaches. Amphibians can be found in the parks, which the gopher snake, tailed frog, clouded salamander, and three species of newts call home. Well-known detritivores, the banana slug and the yellow-spotted millipede, inhabit the parks.

=== Invasive species ===
Over 200 exotic species live in the RNSP. Of these, 30 have been identified as invasive species, and 10 of the 30 are considered threats to local species and ecosystems. Exotic species currently account for about a quarter of the total flora in the parks. Growing in varying amounts over the parks' different vegetation areas, about one percent of plants in old-growth areas are exotic species, compared to 50 to 75 percent in the Bald Hills prairies. Spotted knapweed and poison hemlock were both under consideration in 2015 for addition to a high-priority watch list maintained by the park system.

=== Fire ===
The California Department of Forestry and Fire Protection (CAL FIRE) is responsible for fire management in the redwoods state parks, and NPS manages fire in the national park.

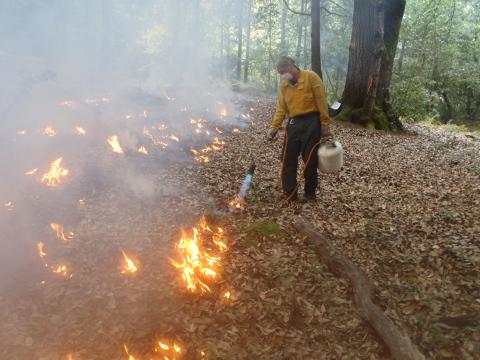
Forest Service research ecologist with mixed tribal ancestry conducting a cultural burn for tanoak acorns in 2019

Because coast redwood bark—in places up to a foot thick—has no resin, the trees are resistant to fire and will regrow after burning. The redwood forest is foggy, humid, not generally susceptible to fire, and lightning strikes among redwoods are rare, meaning that most fires are anthropogenic. A 2003 fire was an exception; a lightning storm started fires in least 274 California locations, including the Canoe Fire in Humboldt Redwoods State Park, which burned from September through October. By about 11 percent, old-growth coast redwoods have the greatest volume of fuels of any forest type.

After they arrived c. 1300 and until white settlers invaded their lands in the 1850s, the Tolowa people intentionally set low-intensity ground fires. (Note: Norman et al. set out in 2009 to correct the record by improving measurements by sampling at 10 to 30 centimetres (3.9 to 11.8 in) of tree height. Earlier studies were conflicting and found fires ranging from rare to frequent; studies finding rare fires were typically measured at 150 to 250 centimetres (59 to 98 in)). Analysis of the new samples found 1- to 5-year frequency only around park open grasslands known as prairies and not in Del Norte Coast Redwoods State Park. Direct comparisons cannot be made, but researchers found frequency of at least 6 to 10 years (more than 5 years) for other areas near the parks.) Indigenous residents, including the Karuk and Tolowa, used fire to protect tanoak trees and their acorns, a primary food supply. Their fires improved their hunting grounds, reduced pests, and decreased the likelihood of larger fires. There is evidence that medium-intensity surface fire was set regularly in the area, but today, after decades of fire suppression and resulting increased fuel density, maximum-intensity crown fire has taken the place of surface fires when fire occurs. Near the tree's crown, coast redwood bark may be less than one inch thick.

Since its founding in 1905, and especially with its policies of the 1930s, the US Forest Service (USFS) has for the most part defended both human settlements and timber companies against fire using wildfire suppression techniques intended to eliminate fire. Repealed in 1937, the 1850 California Act for the Government and Protection of Indians—for which the state apologized in 2019—provided that "Any person was subject to fine or punishment if they set the prairie on fire, or refused to use proper exertions to extinguish the fire." Recognizing that fire has benefits, the service began in the 1970s to change policy to allow fire to burn. More recently in the 2000s, USFS embraced indigenous fire management when USFS researcher Steve Norman advocated "a modified Native American burning model".

In 2020, the Karuk tribe formed the Endowment for Eco-Cultural Revitalization to promote cultural burning in their homeland in the park region. Operating with a new perspective, park managers conduct controlled fires in the grassland areas of the parks—to control invasive species, hold back the spread of Douglas fir, and increase the availability of materials needed by local tribes for basket weaving.

== Recreation ==
The parks have five visitor centers, where general information, maps, and souvenirs are available; some of the centers offer activities during the summer, led by park rangers. There is no entry fee for the RNSP, though some camping areas and park areas require paid passes.

Since the 2019 closure of the DeMartin Redwood Youth Hostel, a low-amenities shared lodging facility near Klamath, California, there are no hotels or motels within the parks' boundaries. About 325 miles (523 km) north of San Francisco, the parks are accessible by air, automobile, and public transit. NPS itself offers no lodging but for accommodations, links to each town from north to south along US 101: Brookings, Oregon, and in California, Crescent City, Klamath, Orick, Trinidad, McKinleyville, Arcata, Eureka, Ferndale, and the counties of Del Norte and Humboldt.

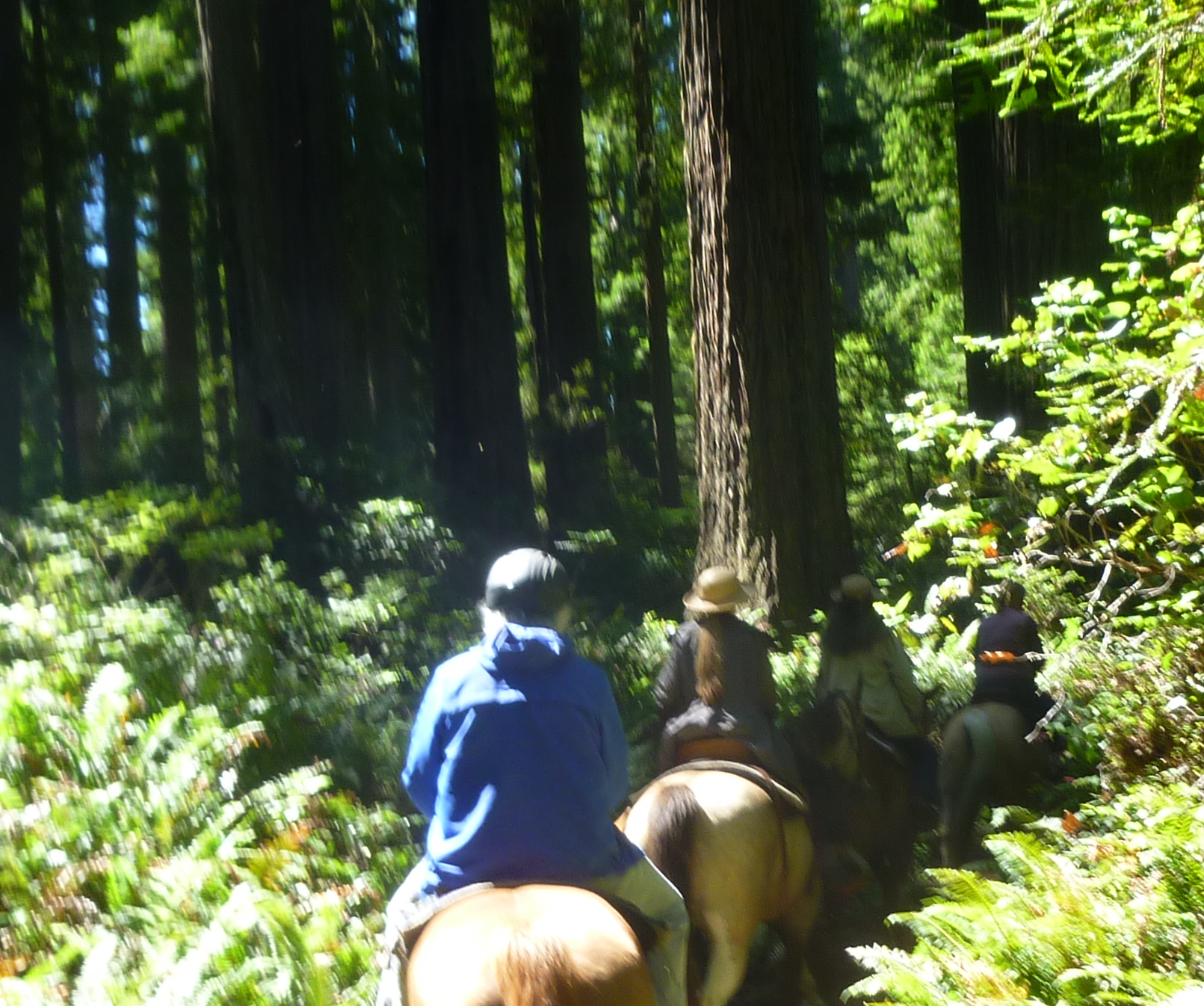
Horseback riders entering Redwood National Park

The state parks have four frontcountry campgrounds which can be accessed by vehicle and used for a fee; the parks' website suggests making a reservation. These are at Mill Creek campground in Del Norte Coast Redwoods State Park and Jedediah Smith campground in Jedediah Smith Redwoods State Park, which together have 231 campsites; the Elk Prairie campground in Prairie Creek Redwoods State Park, which has 75; and the Gold Bluffs Beach campground which has 26. Other nearby parks and recreation areas have additional camping options.

Hiking is the only way to reach the seven backcountry camping areas, the use of which requires a permit. Camping is only allowed in designated sites, except on gravel bars along Redwood Creek that allow for dispersed camping. Proper food storage to minimize encounters with bears is strongly enforced, and hikers and backpackers are required to take out any trash they generate. The NPS subscribes to the seven principles of Leave No Trace.

Almost 200 miles (320 km) of hiking trails exist in the parks. Throughout the year, trails are often wet and hikers need to be well prepared for rainy weather and consult information centers for updates on trail conditions. Some temporary footbridges are removed during the rainy season, as they would be destroyed by high streams.

Horseback riding and mountain biking are allowed on certain trails. Kayaking is permitted, with ranger-led kayak tours offered during the summer. Kayakers and canoeists frequently travel the Smith River, which is the longest undammed river remaining in California. Visitors can fish for salmon and trout in the Smith and Klamath rivers, and the beach areas offer opportunities to catch smelt and perch. A California sport fishing license is required to fish any of the rivers and streams.

== See also ==
- List of national parks of the United States
- Redwoods Rising
- National parks in California
- Lost Man Creek Dam
