= Hyperion (tree) =

World's tallest tree (California, US)

- Location within California
- Species: Coast redwood (Sequoia sempervirens)
- Location: Humboldt County, California, United States
- Coordinates: 41°12.3′N 124°1.0′W (center of closed area)
- Height: 116.22 m (381.3 ft) (2026)
- Volume of trunk: 530 m^{3} (18,600 ft^{3})
- Date seeded: c. 1200–1400
- Custodian: National Park Service

Hyperion is a coast redwood (Sequoia sempervirens D.Don, Endl.) tree in California, which is the world's tallest known living tree, measured at 116.22 metres (381.3 ft) tall in 2026.

Hyperion was discovered on August 25, 2006, by the naturalists Chris Atkins and Michael Taylor. The tree height of 115.55 m (379.1 ft) was verified by Stephen Sillett in 2006 by use of both a laser range finder and a fiberglass tape to measure the tree from the base to the crown. The tree has grown since then to reach 116.22 metres (381.3 ft) recorded in 2026. Hyperion was found in a remote area of Redwood National Park, inside of the originally designated park boundaries of 1968. The park also houses the second-, fourth- and fifth-tallest known trees, coast redwoods named Helios, Icarus, and Daedalus, which respectively measured 377, 371 and 363 feet in 2022.

The tree was named after the titan Hyperion from Greek mythology. Hyperion is estimated to be between 600 and 800 years old and contain 530 m^{3} (18,600 ft^{3}) of wood; it was seeded when the Chilula (a Pacific Coast Athabaskan people) inhabited the region.

The exact location of Hyperion is nominally secret but is available via internet search. However, in July 2022, the Redwood Park superintendent closed the entire area around the tree, citing "devastation of the habitat surrounding Hyperion" caused by visitors. Its base was trampled by the overuse and as a result ferns no longer grow around the tree.

Measures to protect the Hyperion tree were officially implemented in 2022 when the National Park Service (NPS) closed public access to its location in Redwood National Park. Individuals who enter the closed area could face up to six months in jail and a $5,000 maximum fine.

== See also ==
- List of superlative trees
- List of individual trees
- List of tallest trees
