= Save the Redwoods League =

Nonprofit forest conservation organization in San Francisco, California (USA)

- Primary logo

- Commemorative centennial logo and tagline
- Abbreviation: SRL
- Established: 1918; 108 years ago
- Founders: John Campbell Merriam; Madison Grant; Henry Fairfield Osborn
- Type: Nonprofit organization
- Tax ID no.: 94-0843915
- Headquarters: 220 Montgomery Street, Suite 350; San Francisco, California 94104
- Location(s): San Francisco, McKinleyville, and Visalia, California
- Coordinates: 37.7898°N 122.4026°W
- Region served: Northern California coastal forests and Sierra Nevada
- Methods: Conservation easements, land acquisition, transfer, and restoration
- President and CEO: Steve Mietz
- Chief Financial Officer: Linneth Lim
- Chief Development Officer: Tim Whalen
- Chief Operating Officer: Kirsten Tobey
- Board of directors: 13 members
- Revenue: US$68,106,119 (2024)
- Expenses: US$50,621,038 (2024)
- Website: www.savetheredwoods.org
- Formerly called: Save-the-Redwoods League

Save the Redwoods League is a nonprofit organization whose mission is to protect and restore coast redwood (Sequoia sempervirens) and giant sequoia (Sequoiadendron giganteum) trees through the preemptive purchase of development rights of notable areas with such forests.

It relies on donations from private individuals as well as funding from foundations, corporations, government agencies, and investments to buy, restore, and provide public access to redwood forest lands. The League has protected more than 200,000 acres (810 km^{2}) of forestland. As of 2018, the League has helped create 66 redwood parks and reserves, including Humboldt Redwoods State Park and Redwood National and State Parks.

In addition to purchasing and protecting land, Save the Redwoods League supports restoration, research, and education programs, and gives small grants to other organizations involved in ecological conservation. Save the Redwoods League maintains and updates a website which offers information, photos, and progress reports.

== History ==
In 1917, National Park Service Director Stephen Mather asked conservationists John C. Merriam, Madison Grant, and Henry Fairfield Osborn to travel to northern California to investigate the status of the old-growth coast redwoods that were reportedly being logged in vast numbers for building materials. All four of these men were members of the Boone and Crockett Club.

After witnessing the devastation of the forests on their trip, Merriam, Grant, and Osborn decided that protecting the ancient redwoods by purchasing groves and creating a public park was an urgent endeavor, and in 1918 they established Save the Redwoods League to achieve this goal. The first donors to the League were Stephen Mather, E.C. Bradley, William Kent, Henry Fairfield Osborn, and Madison Grant.

In 1919, Newton B. Drury became the first Executive Secretary for Save the Redwoods League. He provided leadership to the League for the next 58 years, also serving as a National Park Service and California State Parks leader.

Also in 1919, members of the California Federation of Women's Clubs established the Women's Save the Redwoods League in Humboldt County. This group had roots over a decade in the making. It was in 1908 that the Humboldt County Federation of Women's Clubs sent a children's petition with over 2,000 signatures to the U.S. Forest Service requesting that President Theodore Roosevelt establish a national redwood park.

Newton B. Drury and the League were instrumental in uniting and forming the California State Park system with the passage of two bills in the California State Legislature that were signed into law by Governor C.C. Young on May 25, 1927.

Major League acquisitions and projects the League supported in the 1930s included the 9,400-acre Rockefeller Forest addition to Humboldt Redwoods State Park, Calaveras North Grove of giant sequoias for Calaveras Big Trees State Park, and 8,252 acres for Prairie Creek Redwoods State Park.

In 1944, the League acquired 4,280 acres for Jedediah Smith Redwoods State Park. In 1945, the League and the Garden Club of America raised money to create the 5,000-acre National Tribute Grove in that same park honoring World War II service members. In 1948, dawn redwoods (Metasequoia glyptostroboides), thought to be extinct were discovered in China and the League funded scientist Ralph Chaney's trip to investigate.

From 1951 to 1959, the League's Newton Drury was the director of the California Division of Beaches and Parks, later known as the California State Parks system. In 1954, the League helped acquire the South Grove of giant sequoias to be added to Calaveras Big Trees State Park.

In 1960, the Avenue of the Giants Parkway was founded in Humboldt Redwoods State Park preceded by a 40-year land acquisition process by the League. In 1968, after years of lobbying, Redwood National Park was established by Congress.

In the 1970s and 1980s, the League continued to protect land for redwood parks. Notable acquisitions included 1,662 acres for Purisima Creek Redwoods Open Space Preserve and 3,858-acre Big Creek Reserve for Julia Pfeiffer Burns State Park.

In the 1980s and 1990s, Navarro River Redwoods State Park lands were purchased by the League and land was acquired for Limekiln State Park and Wilder Ranch State Park. In 2001, the League purchased the Dillonwood giant sequoia grove and transferred it to Sequoia National Park. In 2002, the League purchased the 25,000-acre Mill Creek Forest, its largest acquisition to date which became part of Del Norte Coast Redwoods State Park. In the 2000s, the League protected 7,334 acres for Mendocino Headlands State Park. In 2009, the League's Redwood Climate Change Initiative at Humboldt State University began.

In the 2010s, the League helped protect Noyo River Redwoods, Four Corners, the Orick Mill Site, Peters Creek and Boulder Creek old-growth forests, and Big River-Mendocino Old-Growth Redwoods. The League also established conservation easements for 15,000-acre Mailliard Ranch, the 8,500-acre San Vicente Redwoods and 870-acre Stewarts Point.

In 2018, the League celebrated its centennial year launching the "Stand for the Redwoods, Stand for the Future" campaign and publishing the Centennial Vision for Redwoods Conservation that includes the goal to "double the size of coast redwood forests in parks and reserves to 800,000 acres." The California State Senate declared 2018 the Year of the Redwoods with the passage of SR 100, authored by Senator Mike McGuire and many co-authors. The California State Assembly adopted House Resolution (HR 96), authored by Assemblymember Mark Stone, recognizing the League's 100th birthday. And, on September 27, 2018, California Governor Jerry Brown declared October 2018 as "California Redwoods Month", recognizing redwoods as a "globally significant treasure" and encouraging people to "support organizations working to ensure a healthy future for our redwood forests." In April 2018, the League joined the National Park Service and California State Parks to form Redwoods Rising, a restoration initiative.

=== Criticism ===
The League has been accused of greenwashing as well as actively promoting the loss of redwoods in certain areas. Some of these charges were detailed by journalist and environmental activist Greg King in his 2023 book The Ghost Forest: Racists, Radicals, and Real Estate in the California Redwoods.

=== Connection to Eugenics ===
Three of the League's founders—Madison Grant, John C. Merriam, and Henry Fairfield Osborn—have been recorded as supporters of eugenics.

Two years prior to the League's founding in 1918, Grant published The Passing of the Great Race (1916). The book promoted Nordicism and anti-immigration ideology. Grant was also a member of the Eugenics Research Association, the Pioneer Fund, and was one of the founding members of the American Eugenics Society.

Osborn originally wrote the preface for Grant's book during its 1916 publishing in which he advocated for Grant's book and eugenics. Osborn additionally wrote the preface to the second edition of Grant's book published in 1917. In this second preface, Osborn asserted the Nordic race was superior to others and was at risk of being out-bred. Osborn was also a founding member of the American Eugenics Society alongside Grant.

In his 1926 article Medicine and the Evolution of Society, Merriam encouraged the further study of eugenics. Merriam argued that interracial relationships involved "breeding from weak stock" and would eventually cause the superior race to disappear.

The League has acknowledged their founders' beliefs in eugenics and has condemned their views. California State Parks has worked with the League to create and place informational panels highlighting the racist origins of many parks.

== Science-based strategy and research ==
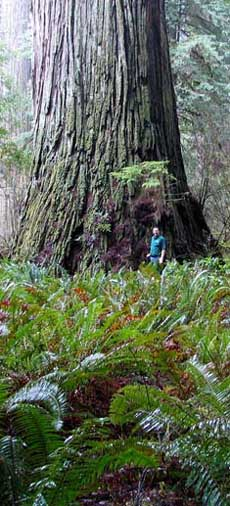
Arborist next to Del Norte Titan at the Grove of Titans

The League's Vibrant Forests Plan attempts to provide a science-based conservation strategy for the remaining coast redwood and giant sequoia ecosystems. Conservation decisions made by the League are guided by the Vibrant Forests Plan's strategies, helping to set priorities for land acquisitions, stewardship, and restoration initiatives.

In 2018, the League published a State of the Redwoods Conservation Report for the first time. The report draws on scientific research to evaluate environmental threats facing coast redwoods and giant sequoia, how much progress has been made to date mitigating each threat, and whether that progress is continuing or in decline. Some key threats include the amount of unprotected forests, number of trees with old-growth characteristics, level of human encroachment, and fire preparedness status.

The League has an active scientific research program that seeks to expand the understanding of the coast redwood and giant sequoia forests and ecosystems of which they are a key component. Their Research Grants Program provides funding to leading scientists studying redwood forest ecosystems, threatened and endangered species, and climate change impacts. Some of the major League-led research projects are the Redwoods and Climate Change Initiative (RCCI), the Redwood Genome Project, and Citizen Science Programs.

The Giant Sequoia Lands Coalition is a partner to the League focused on the conservation of the giant sequoia groves, and in recent years has accelerated restoration across 25 groves. Drawing on shared research and data, the Coalition works to manage fuel reductions, prescribed fires, post-wildfire restoration, as well as long term monitoring of the sequoia ecosystem to address threats from wildfires and climate change.

LiDAR is a key scientific technology used by the League and its forest researchers to aid in measuring tree height, biomass, and leaf area. This information can be useful in reforestation efforts, and also in finding the tallest redwood trees. The League's first use of LiDAR was made possible by a grant from Kenneth Fisher.

== Expansion of parks and preserves ==
Since it was established, the League has protected over 200,000 acres (81,000 ha) of ancient redwoods. Land purchased by the League is generally donated to California State Parks, which the organization helped found, or to the National Park Service for permanent protection of the redwoods, as well as public enjoyment and education.

The League also provides gifts to establish and grow regional preserves and parks, many of which are open to the public. For example, the League established the Purisima Creek Redwoods Open Space Preserve which is part of the Midpeninsula Regional Open Space District (Midpen) in the San Francisco Bay Area.

In a recent expansion endeavor, Save the Redwoods League has agreed to purchase a 200-acre property in northwest Sonoma County for $4 million, intended to expand the Harold Richardson Redwoods Reserve. The addition will increase the reserve to nearly 1,000 acres and includes coastal redwood forest, a 35-acre old-growth grove, and surrounding habitat supporting species such as the northern spotted owl and marbled murrelet. The expansion follows the League's 2018 acquisition of the original 730-acre reserve. According to California state park information on Richardson Grove State Park, the region has grown from an initial 120-acre plot to about 1,800 acres through support from Save the Redwoods League and donors.

Save the Redwoods League donated the Atkins Place property to California State Parks, expanding Montgomery Woods State Natural Preserve by 453 acres. The land addition includes second-growth coast redwood and oak woodland habitat, as well as 1.25 miles (2.01 km) of streams. The transfer was part of Save the Redwoods League's Montgomery Woods Initiative and was completed on Earth Day.

== Educational programs ==
The League provides numerous educational programs and resources to help K–12 students learn about redwoods forests in the classroom and on field trips. These programs give students the opportunity to learn STEM subjects from real-world examples, to be inspired to protect the forests, and to discover career opportunities in scientific research, park interpretation, and forest management. The League provides many educational resources and curriculum materials directly to teachers and partners with other organizations to extend their reach, such as by providing educational grants.

== Memorial Groves ==
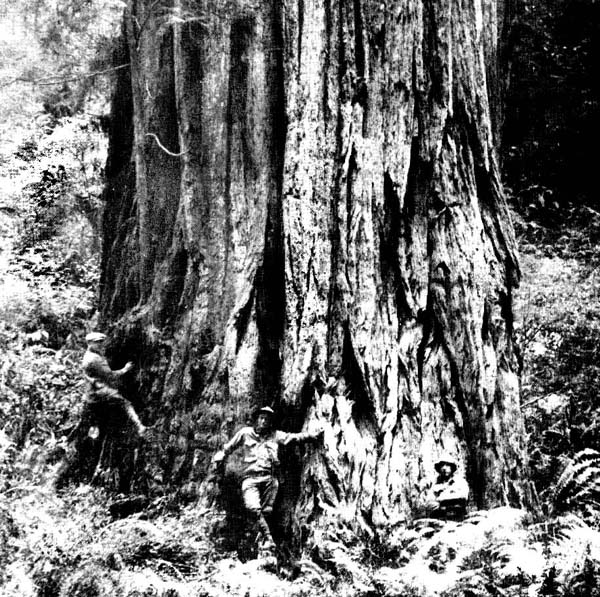
Frederick Russell Burnham, a founding member of the League, at his 5,000-acre (20 km^{2}) La Cuesta cattle ranch, Three Rivers, California, near the entrance to Sequoia Park in 1908

In 1921, Boone and Crockett Club member Dr. John C. Phillips donated $32,000 to purchase land and create the Raynal Bolling Memorial Grove in the Humboldt Redwoods State Park. That same year, the Stephen T. Mather – William Kent Grove was also established in the same park. Since 1921, the League has established over 1000 redwood memorial groves, in more than thirty of California's redwood parks. One grove is named after Newton B. Drury, who served as executive director of the league as well as serving as the fourth director of the National Park Service. He served in the league's leadership during most of the period from 1919 to 1978. Another grove is named after Drury and his brother Aubrey.

The League continues to operate a Dedicated Grove or Tree Program to help raise funds to carry out its mission. In return for a donation, a grove or tree can be named as a memorial to or in honor of an individual, family, or organization.

=== Founders Grove ===
In 1931, Major Frederick Russell Burnham commissioned a survey near Bull Flat Creek in Humboldt County, a spot where League founder Madison Grant believed the world's tallest tree might be found. When the tree, a 364-foot redwood, was indeed found, the California State Park Commission dedicated the tree to the founders of the Save the Redwoods League on September 13, 1931: "As a living monument symbolizing eternal life and duration of our gratitude." Burnham led the main address in which he declared: "It is an ancient and racial urge that has brought us together today in the shade of this far western forest like the druids of old." The Founders Tree immediately became and remains the most visited spot in the redwoods region and the focus of many ceremonies. The height measurement has since been revised to 346.1 feet (105.5 m).

Multiple plaques commemorating the League's founders were installed within Founders Grove. In 2019, California State Parks began working with the League to revise plaques that did not represent the true history of the land, including the founders involvement with eugenics. Two plaques were removed and were replaced with a plaque detailing the indigenous people who previously lived in the grove, the contribution of women to the grove's conservation, and Grant and Osborn's support of eugenics.

Additionally, in 2021, changes in Prairie Creek Redwoods State Park were also made. With the removal of a memorial rock dated back to 1948 honoring Madison Grant, the Save the Redwoods League takes further account of its founder's legacy.

== See also ==
- Coast redwood groves
- Giant sequoia groves
