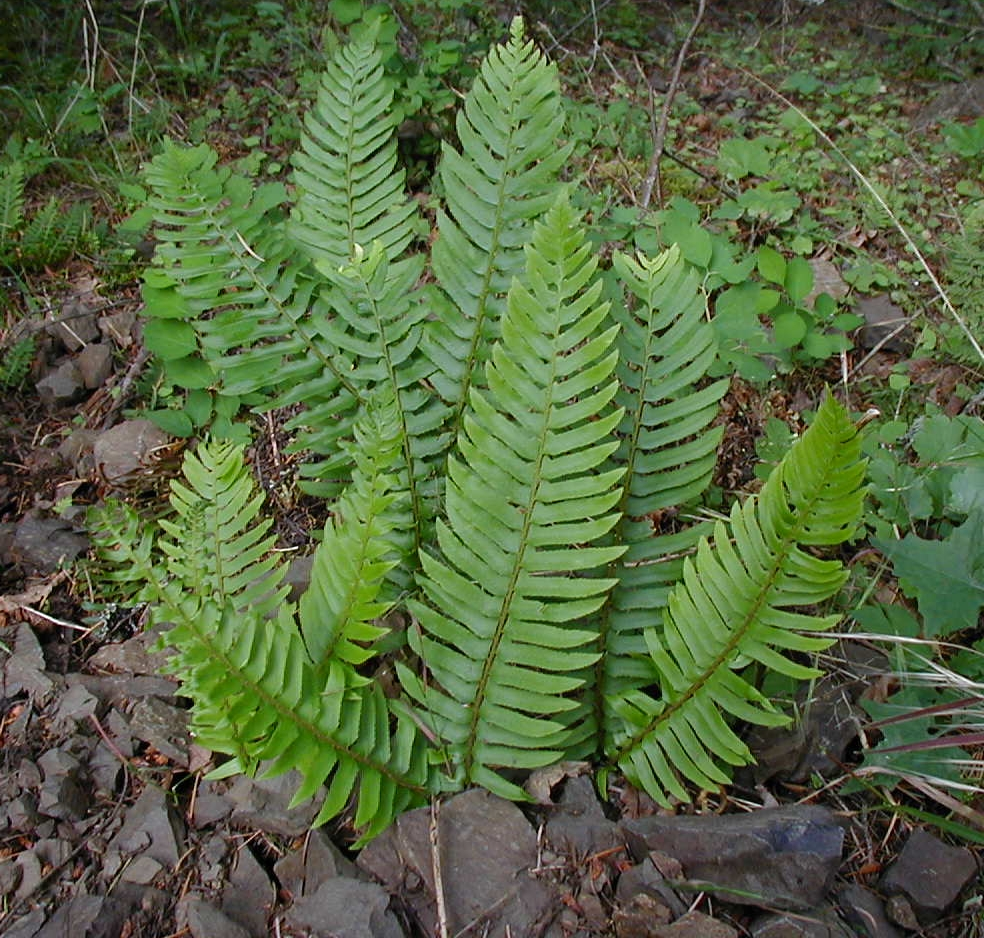
- Western sword fern growing in the Columbia River Gorge

Scientific classification
- Kingdom: Plantae
- Clade: Embryophytes
- Clade: Tracheophytes
- Division: Polypodiophyta
- Class: Polypodiopsida
- Order: Polypodiales
- Suborder: Polypodiineae
- Family: Dryopteridaceae
- Genus: Polystichum
- Species: P. munitum

Binomial name
- Polystichum munitum (Kaulf.) C.Presl

Synonyms
- Aetopteron munitum (Kaulf.) House 1920; Aspidium munitum Kaulf. 1824; Dryopteris munita (Kaulf.) Kuntze 1891; Aspidium munitum var. incisoserratum D.C.Eaton 1878; Aspidium munitum var. nudatum D.C.Eaton 1878 publ. 1879; Nephrodium plumula C.Presl 1825; Polystichum munitum f. flabellatum A.A.Eaton 1901; Polystichum munitum var. incisoserratum (D.C.Eaton) Underw. 1900; Polystichum munitum f. incisoserratum (D.C.Eaton) Clute & H.St.John 1928; Polystichum munitum subsp. incisoserratum (D.C.Eaton) Piper & Beattie 1915; Polystichum munitum subsp. nudatum (D.C.Eaton) Ewan 1942; Polystichum munitum f. nudatum (D.C.Eaton) M.Broun 1938; Polystichum munitum subsp. solitarium Maxon 1903; Polystichum plumula C.Presl 1836; Polystichum solitarium Underw. 1908

= Polystichum munitum =

Western North American fern

Polystichum munitum, the western swordfern, is an evergreen perennial fern native to western North America, where it is one of the most abundant ferns in forested areas. It occurs along the Pacific coast from southeastern Alaska to southern California, and also inland east to southeastern British Columbia, northern Idaho and western Montana, with disjunctive populations in northern British Columbia, Canada; the Black Hills in South Dakota, United States; and Guadalupe Island off of Baja California, Mexico. Western swordfern is known to have locally naturalized in parts of Great Britain and Ireland.

== Description ==
The dark green fronds of this fern grow 50 to 180 centimetres (1.6 to 5.9 ft) tall, in a tight clump spreading out radially from a round base. They are single-pinnate, with the pinnae alternating on the stalk. Each pinna is 1 to 15 centimetres (0.39 to 5.91 in) long, with a small upward-pointing lobe (a sword hilt, hence the name) at the base, and the edges are serrated with bristly tips on the serrations. Beyond the upward-pointing lobe, the pinnae are broadly linear in shape, usually with a gradual taper and curved slightly toward the distal end of the frond. Individual fronds live for 1.5 to 2.5 years and remain attached to the rhizome after withering. When they emerge in spring, the fronds are doubled back on themselves and circinate (rolled up) only at the tip. The round sori occupy two rows on either side of the midrib of each pinna and are covered by a centrally-attached, umbrella-like indusium with fringed edges. They produce light yellow spores. In deep shade, fronds spread nearly horizontally, but with increasing sun exposure, grow more upright. In young plants, the leaves are often paler green and have shorter pinnae.

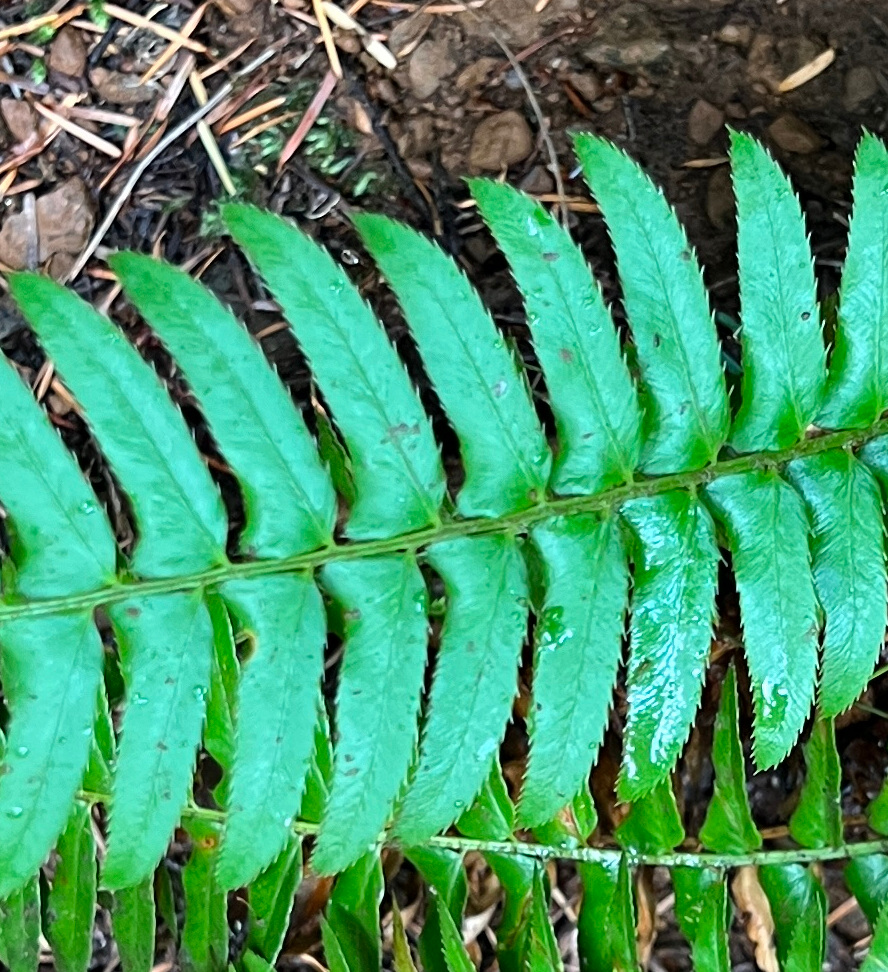
Pinnae shape

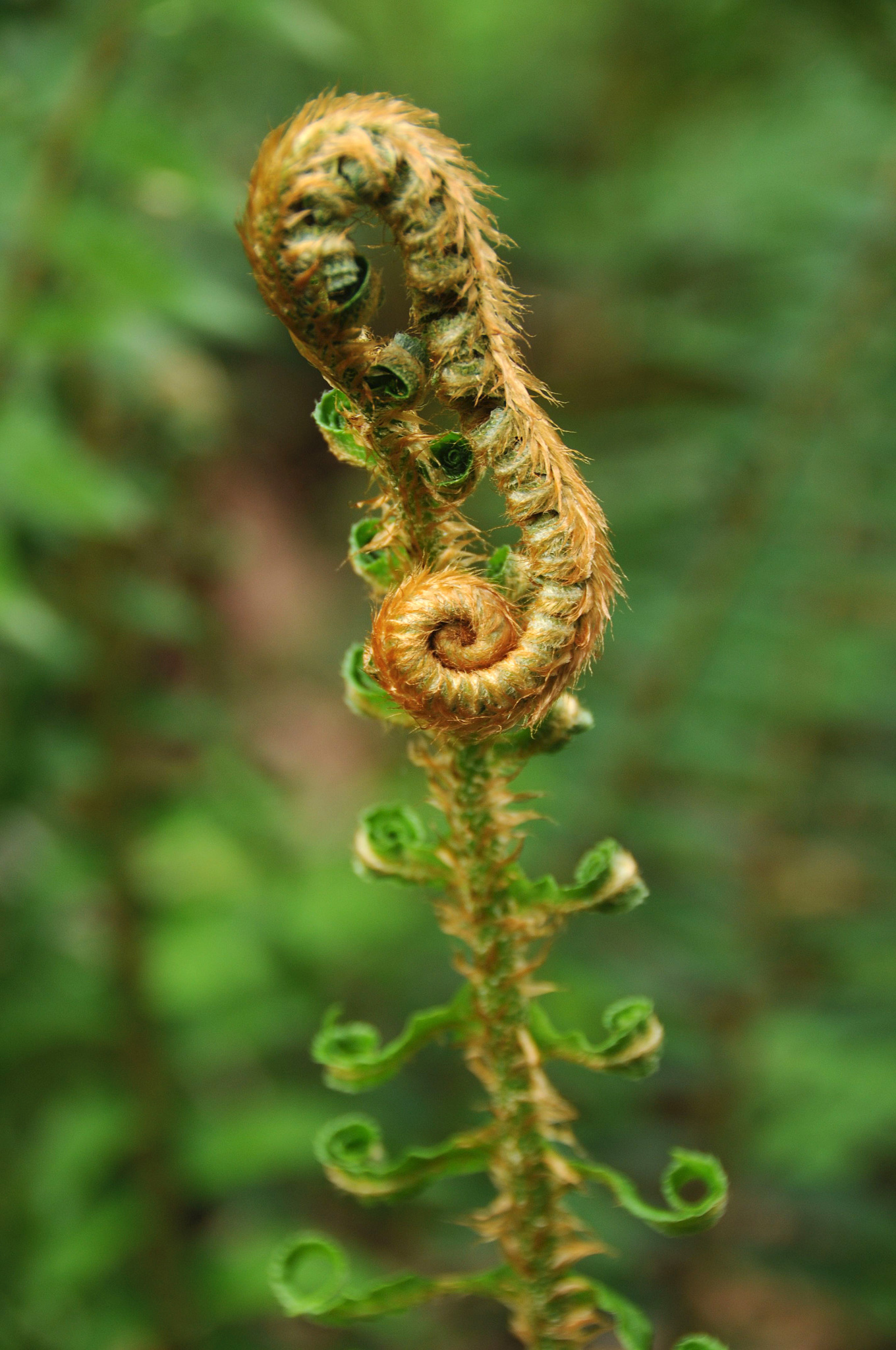
Young frond

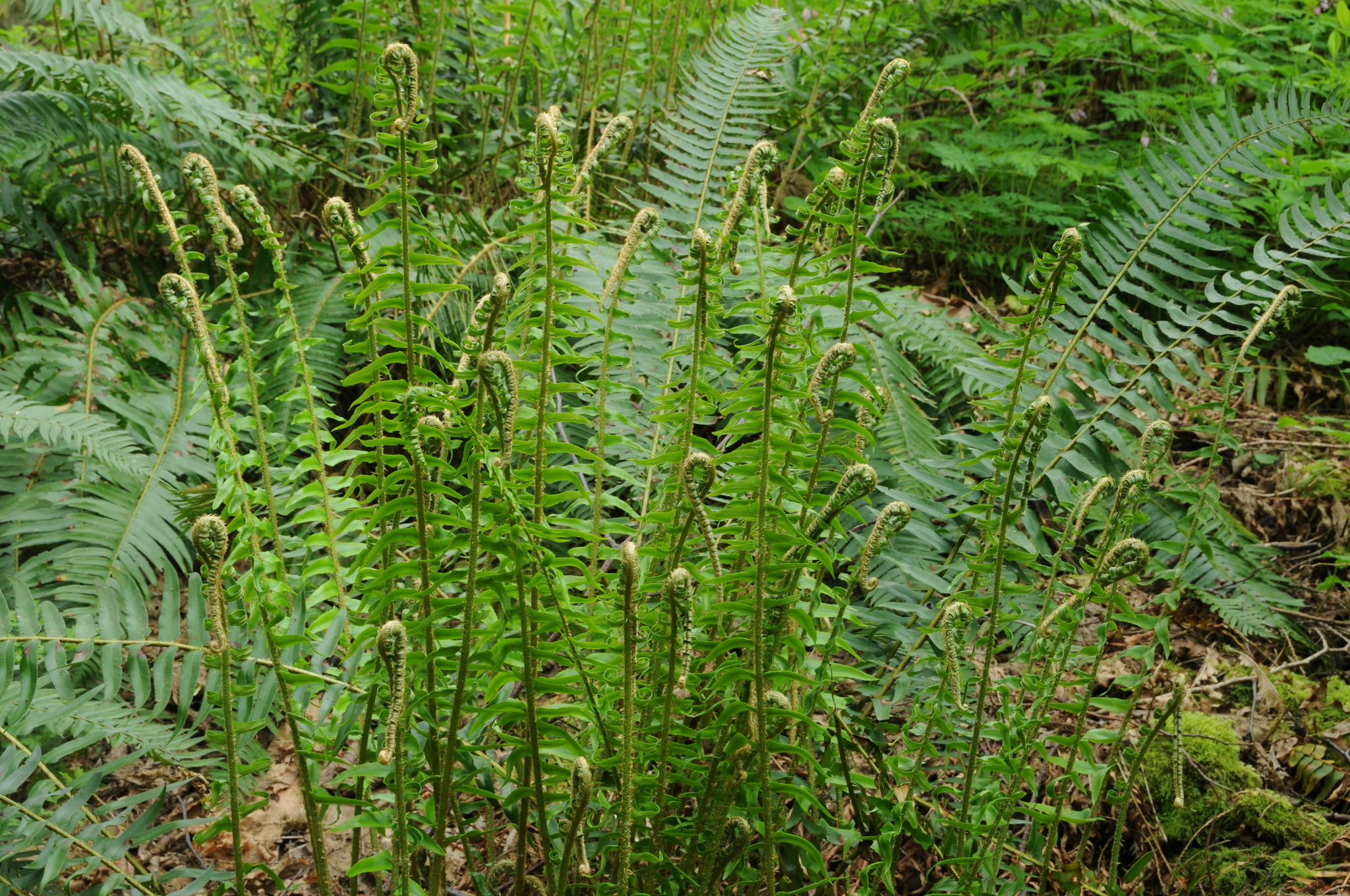
Plant with young fronds

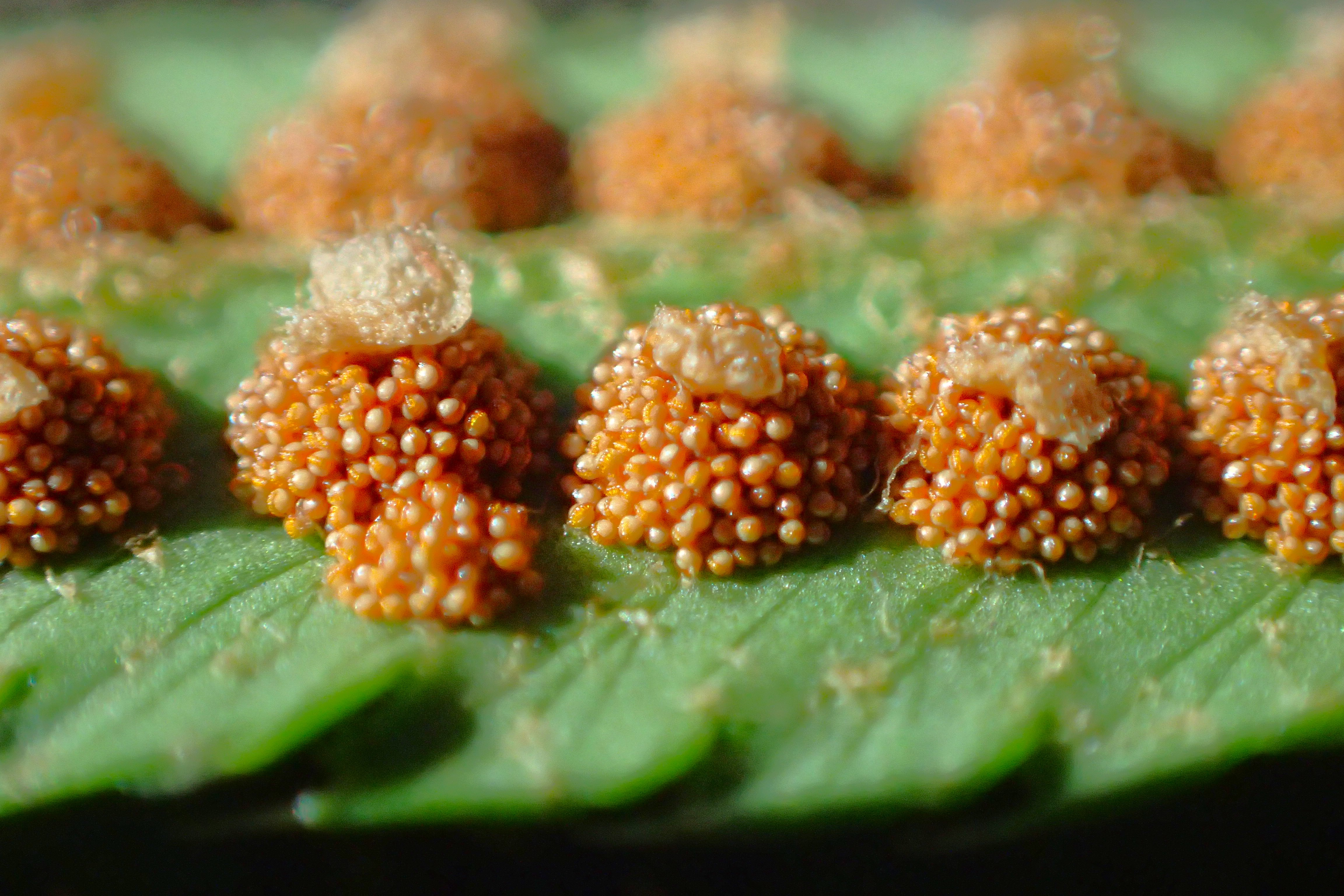
Sorus

== Habitat and cultivation ==
The preferred habitat of this fern is the understory of moist coniferous woodlands at low elevations. It grows best in well-drained acidic soil of rich humus and small stones. It is very resilient and survives occasional droughts, but flourishes only with consistent moisture, and it prefers cool weather.

In cultivation, it also responds well to regular, light fertilization. While this fern is a favored horticultural subject in western North America, it has proved difficult or impossible to cultivate satisfactorily in the eastern part of the continent.

In the United Kingdom Polystichum munitum has gained the Royal Horticultural Society's Award of Garden Merit.

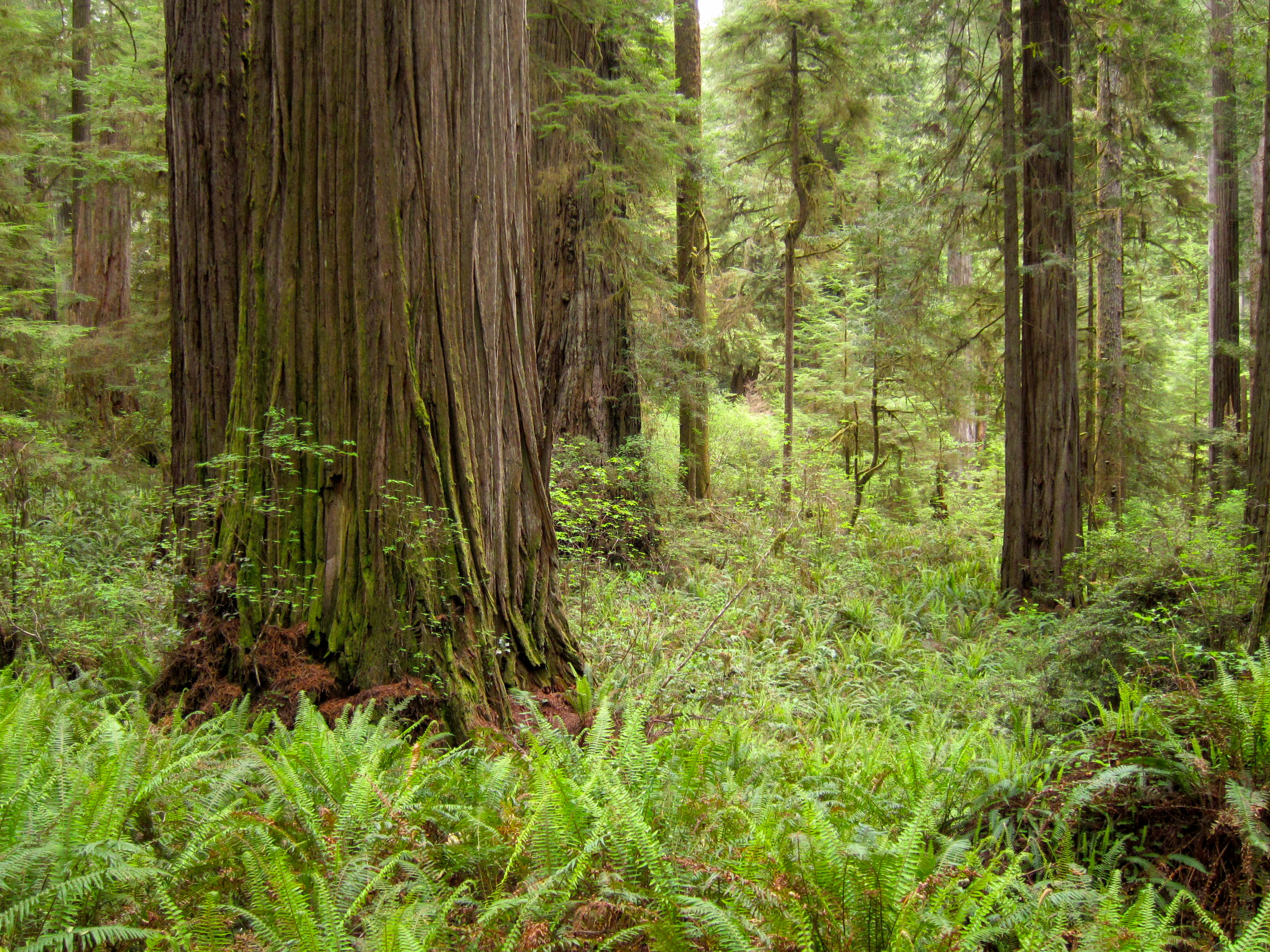
Plants growing in Redwood forest habitat in Jedediah Smith Redwoods State Park

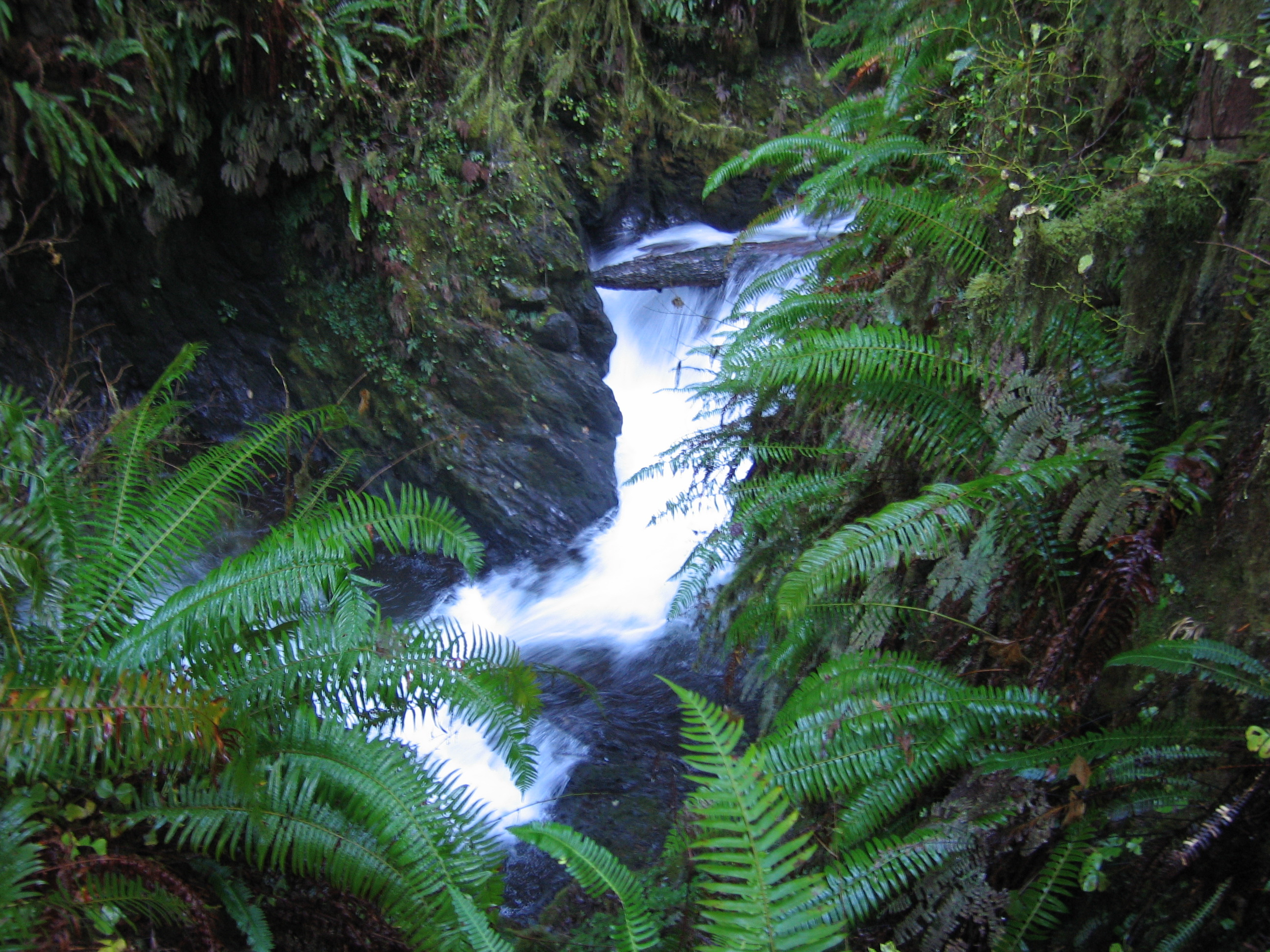
Sword fern habitat near Lake Quinault in Washington, United States

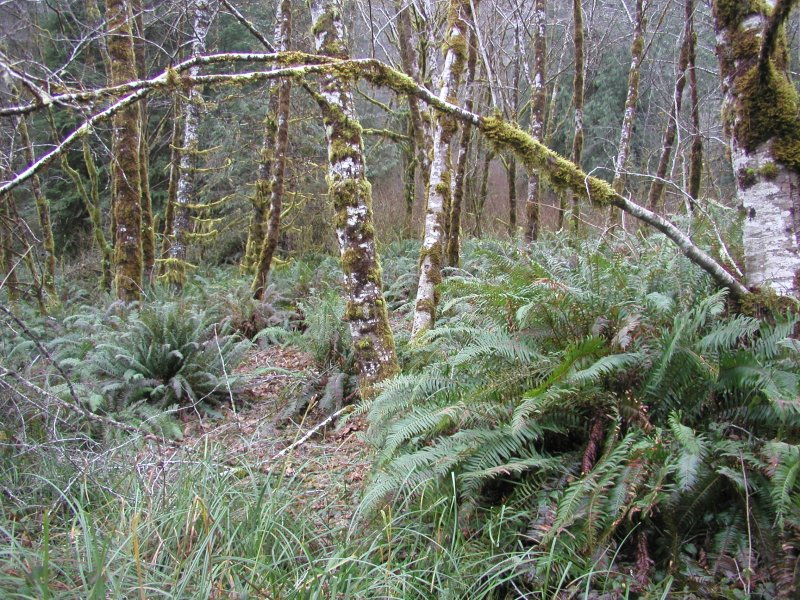
Plants growing below red alder near Drift Creek in the Oregon Coast Range

== Phylogeny ==
According to a molecular phylogeny of Polystichum ferns based on plastid DNA sequences, P. munitum is most closely related to other North American Polystichum species, including the western species Polystichum lemmonii, Polystichum scopulinum, and Polystichum dudleyi, and the eastern species Polystichum acrostichoides.

== Utility ==
The Coast Salish people of B.C. and Washington state use this plant as a pain reliever. When applied directly to the area where pain and inflammation occur, according to Della Rice Sylvester, an elder and medicine woman of the Cowichan tribe, the sword fern "takes the pain away!". This traditional use has spread among the hiking communities and youth scouting organizations of the region, where it is a common piece of hiker's lore that a rash from a stinging nettle can be counteracted by rubbing the spores on the underside of sword fern on the area.

In spring, when other food is unavailable, Quileute, Makah, Klallam, Squamish, Sechelt, Haida, and other Native American/First Nations peoples roasted, peeled, and ate the rhizomes. The fronds were used to line fire pits and food drying racks and as filling for mattresses. The plant is also cultivated for its ornamental foliage, which florists include in vases. The fronds were widely used in other cultures. It is used as 'famine food', place mats, dancing skirts, and flower arrangements.
