= Stephen C. Sillett =

American botanist (born 1968)

- Born: March 19, 1968 (age 58); Harrisburg, Pennsylvania, U.S.
- Education: Reed College (BA); University of Florida College of Liberal Arts and Sciences (MS); Oregon State University (PhD)
- Occupation: Botanist
- Spouse: Marie E. Antoine (m. 2001)
- Scientific career
- Fields: Botany

Stephen C. Sillett (born March 19, 1968) is an American botanist specializing in old growth forest canopies. As the first scientist to enter the redwood forest canopy, he pioneered new methods for climbing, exploring, and studying tall trees. Sillett has climbed many of the world's tallest trees to study the plant and animal life residing in their crowns and is generally recognized as an authority on tall trees, especially redwoods (Sequoia sempervirens).

He is the first Kenneth L. Fisher Chair in Redwood Forest Ecology for the Department of Biological Sciences at Cal Poly Humboldt. He is featured in Richard Preston's New York Times best seller The Wild Trees, as well as in academic journals, general interest magazines, and nature television programs. He lives in Arcata, California, with wife Marie Antoine, a botanist and fellow forest canopy research scientist.

== Early life and education ==
Sillett was born March 19, 1968, in Harrisburg, Pennsylvania. He has a younger sister, Liana, and an older brother, Scott, who is also featured in The Wild Trees. Both Sillett brothers were inspired to pursue careers in science by their grandmother, Helen Poe Sillett, who was a bird enthusiast.

Sillett studied biology as an undergraduate at Reed College in Portland, Oregon, to pursue his interest in botany, later refocusing on tall trees and Lobaria, a type of nitrogen-fixing lichen associated with old-growth forests, in the Pacific Northwest. He received his Bachelor of Arts in 1989. He went on to receive a Master of Science in Botany from the University of Florida in 1991, and a Doctor of Philosophy from Oregon State University in 1995.

== Career ==
Sillett began teaching at Cal Poly Humboldt in 1996, where he dedicates much of his time to field study of not only coast redwood but also giant sequoia (Sequoiadendron giganteum), Douglas-fir (Pseudotsuga menziesii), Sitka spruce (Picea sitchensis), and the tallest trees of the Southern Hemisphere, Eucalyptus regnans and E. globulus. He currently teaches courses in General Botany, Lichens and Bryophytes, and Forest Canopy Ecology at Cal Poly Humboldt.

=== Research ===
==== Early ====
Sillett began climbing Douglas-fir trees during his undergraduate years at Reed College. While working on his Masters, he studied a cloud forest canopy in Costa Rica, focusing on bryophytes inhabiting the emergent crowns of strangler figs (Ficus tuerckheimii). His doctorate work focused on old-growth Douglas-fir forests in the Cascade Mountains of western Oregon. It was not until he began teaching at Cal Poly Humboldt that he began climbing and studying redwood forests.

==== Later ====
After moving to northwestern California, Sillett began studying old-growth redwood forests and the biodiversity found in their canopies. Additionally, Sillett studies how water is transported up the tree in an effort to understand the limits to tree height. One of his chief interests is in determining the maximum attainable heights of the 6 tallest tree species.

To reach the canopies, he uses an arrow to set a climbing line, then ascends using a modified arborist-style safety swing involving ropes, leather harnesses, and pulleys. Once in the canopy, Sillett and his research crew move about in a style known as skywalking using motion lanyards on a web of climbing ropes. To reach outlying branches, Sillett deploys a Tyrolean traverse between adjacent trees.

In addition to studying redwood canopies, Sillett studies other tall forests in the US, Canada, and Australia. He has climbed and measured the tallest of each of the six tallest trees species. Sillett and his team do not disclose precise locations of the world's tallest trees. Sillett allows only students and research team members to climb with him, to maintain both the security of the trees and the safety of fellow researchers.

=== Major accomplishments ===
- Discovery of the redwood Grove of Titans in 1998, accompanied by Michael Taylor.
- Sillett began climbing redwoods in 1987, becoming the first scientist to enter the old-growth redwood forest canopy.
- He has climbed and measured the height of the tallest known live-topped tree of each of the five tree species known to grow over 100 m (300 ft) tall.
- In 2006, Sillett measured and verified the redwood Hyperion as the world's tallest tree at 115.55 m (379.1 ft). Previous record-holder Stratosphere Giant is 112.83 m (370.5 ft).
- Sillett is the first holder of the Kenneth L. Fisher Chair in Redwood Forest Ecology at Cal Poly Humboldt. This is the world's first and only endowed chair supporting the study of one tree species. The endowment is designed to promote field research of redwood canopies.
- Sillett, wife Marie Antoine, brother Scott, and other climbing and research companions including Michael Taylor and Chris Atkins are featured in Richard Preston's book The Wild Trees. The book details some notable climbs, including his first ascent into the crown of a tall redwood tree.
- Sillett's research has been published in a number of academic journals including Nature, the American Journal of Botany, Ecological Monographs, Ecological Applications, Bryologist, Northwest Science, and Madroño. His research has also been profiled in The New Yorker (by Richard Preston), Discover, New Scientist, and National Geographic.
- Sillett has been profiled on nature television programs such as National Geographic's Wild Chronicles, BBC's Planet Earth, and PBS's Oregon Field Guide.
- Sillett was named Scholar of the Year at Cal Poly Humboldt in 2006.

== Personal life ==
His wife, Marie E. Antoine, a fellow botanist, lectures at Cal Poly Humboldt and assists Sillett in his field research. They were married on December 8, 2001.

== Awards and affiliations ==
In addition to being a Grantee to the Save the Redwoods League, some of Sillett's awards and acknowledgments include:

- The William Sterling Sullivant Award for Best Bryophyte Paper (1995)
- A National Science Foundation Fellowship
- The Beinecke Brothers Memorial Scholarship

Affiliations include:

- Ecological Society of America
- American Bryological and Lichenological Society
- Northwest Scientific Association
- California Native Plant Society
- California Faculty Association
- International Canopy Network

== Recent publications ==
- Sillett, S. C., and R. Van Pelt. 2007. Trunk reiteration promotes epiphytes and water storage in an old-growth redwood forest canopy. Ecological Monographs, in press.
- Williams, C. B., and S. C. Sillett. 2007. Epiphyte communities on redwood (Sequoia sempervirens) in northwestern California, USA. Bryologist 110:420-452.
- Woolley, L. P., T. W. Henkel, and S. C. Sillett. 2007. Reiteration in the monodominant tropical tree Dicymbe corymbosa and its potential adaptive significance. Biotropica, in press.
