= Jedediah Smith Redwoods State Park =

State park in northern California, United States

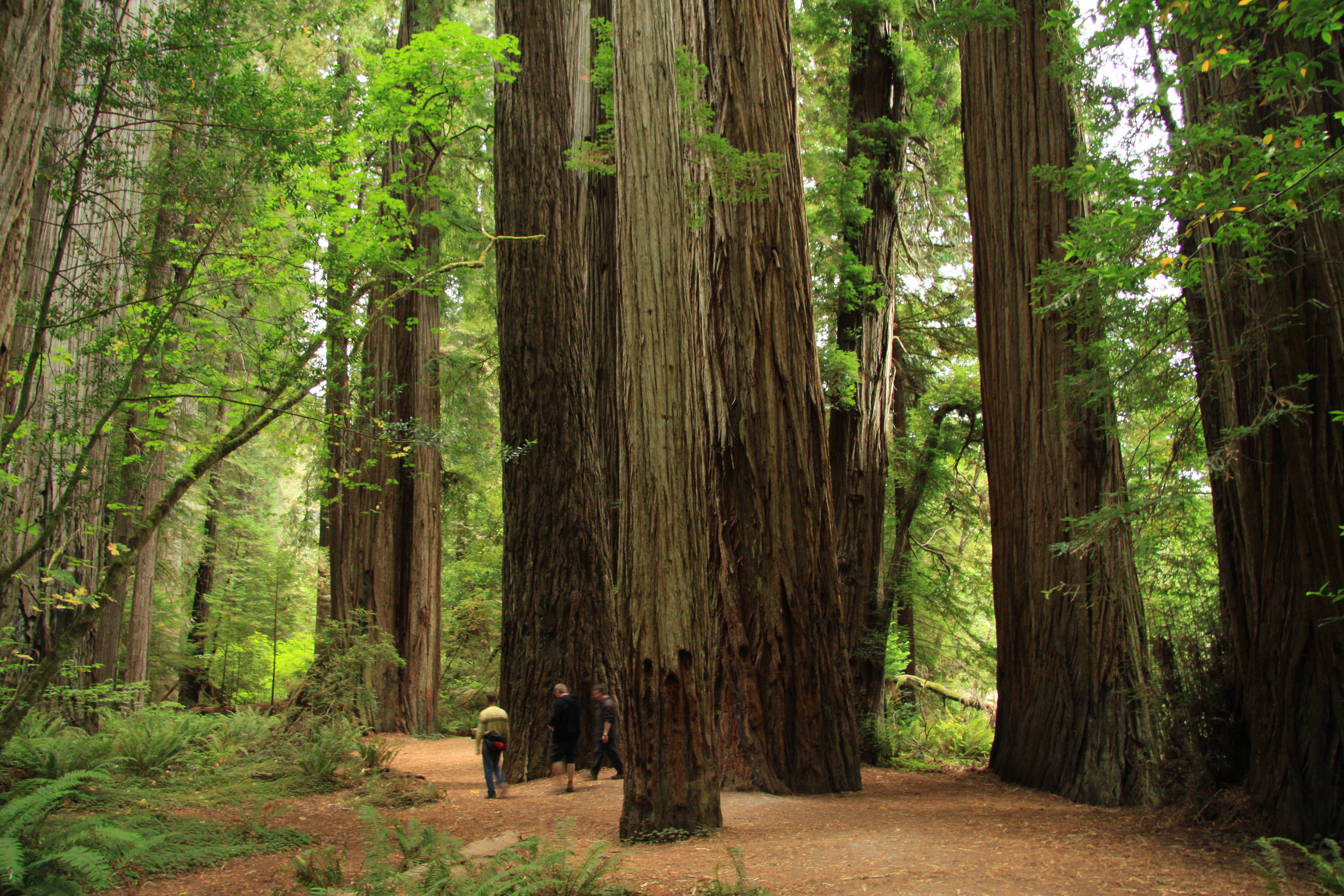
- Stout Memorial Grove

- Location within California Location within the United States
- Location: Del Norte County, California, United States
- Nearest city: Crescent City, California
- Coordinates: 41°46′54″N 124°6′2″W
- Area: 10,430 acres (4,220 ha; 16.30 mi^{2}; 42.2 km^{2})
- Established: 1929
- Governing body: California Department of Parks and Recreation

Jedediah Smith Redwoods State Park is a state park of California, United States, preserving old-growth redwoods along the Smith River. It is located along U.S. Route 199 approximately 9 miles (14 km) east of Crescent City. The park is named after explorer Jedediah Smith, and is one of four parks cooperatively managed as Redwood National and State Parks. The other parks include the Del Norte Coast Redwoods State Park, Prairie Creek Redwoods State Park, and Redwood National Park. The 42.2-square-kilometre (16.3 mi^{2}) park was established in 1929 and designated part of the California Coast Ranges International Biosphere Reserve in 1983.

== History ==
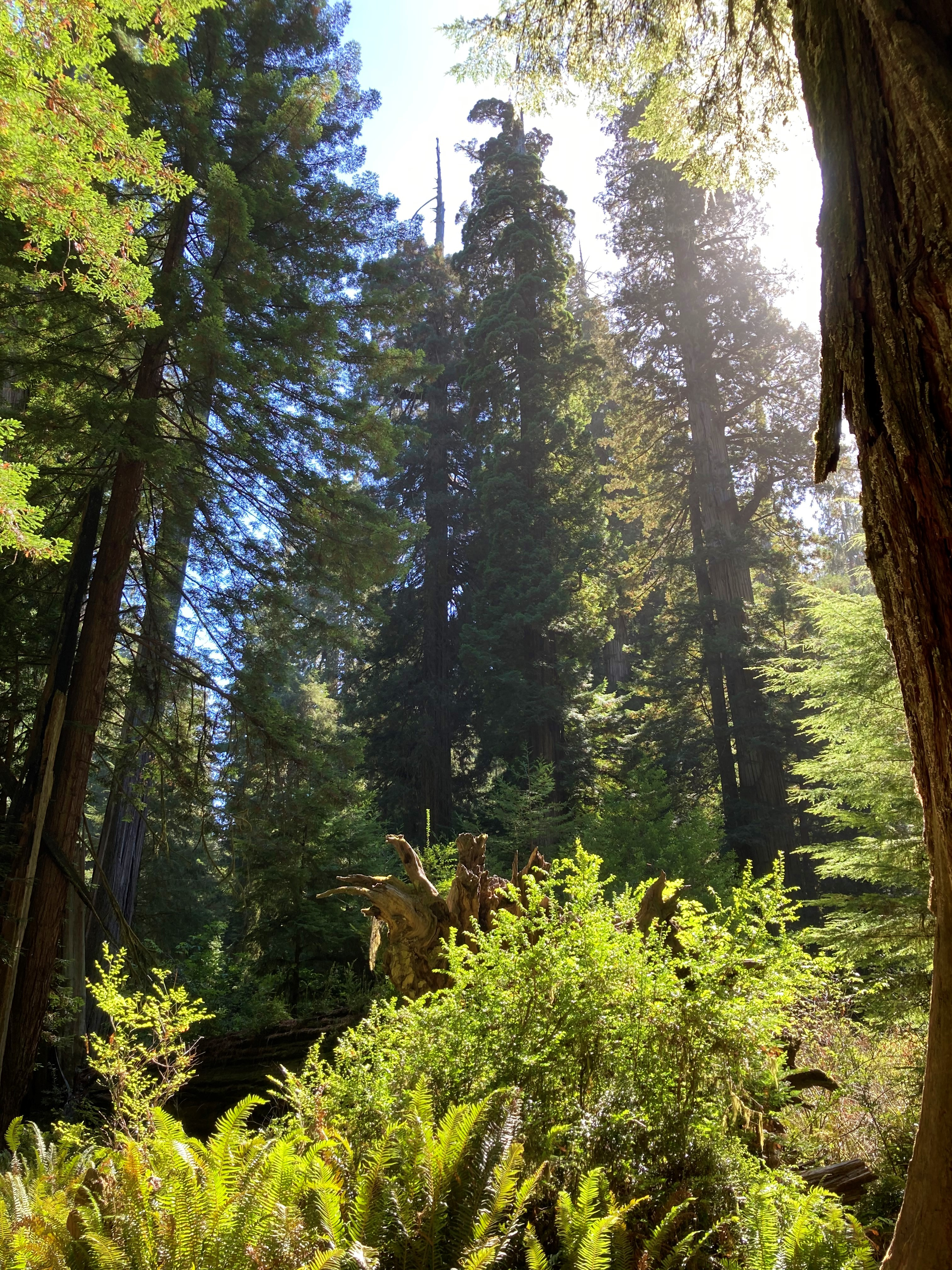
Light coming through the canopy in Jedediah Smith Redwood State Park

The park was named after explorer Jedediah Smith, who was the first American to travel, by land, from the Mississippi River to California in 1826, passing through the area of the future park.

The original Tolowa people depended on the resources of the Smith River and the redwood forests. They used the forest for shelter, tools, and cultural practices. Archeological discoveries have found evidence of human occupation dating back over 8,000 years. Descendants of the Tolowa still live in the region and preserve many of their traditions.

== Ecology ==
The park consists of 9,500 acres (38 km^{2}; 14.8 mi^{2}) of redwood trees, including several groves of old growth trees. One of the groves, totaling 5,000 acres (20 km^{2}; 7.8 mi^{2}), includes the world's largest (not tallest) coast redwood, which measures 20 feet (6.1 m) in diameter and 340 feet (100 m) tall.

The Smith River, which flows through the park, is home to rainbow trout and salmon, black bears, black-tailed deer, squirrels, chipmunks, raccoons and other mammals.

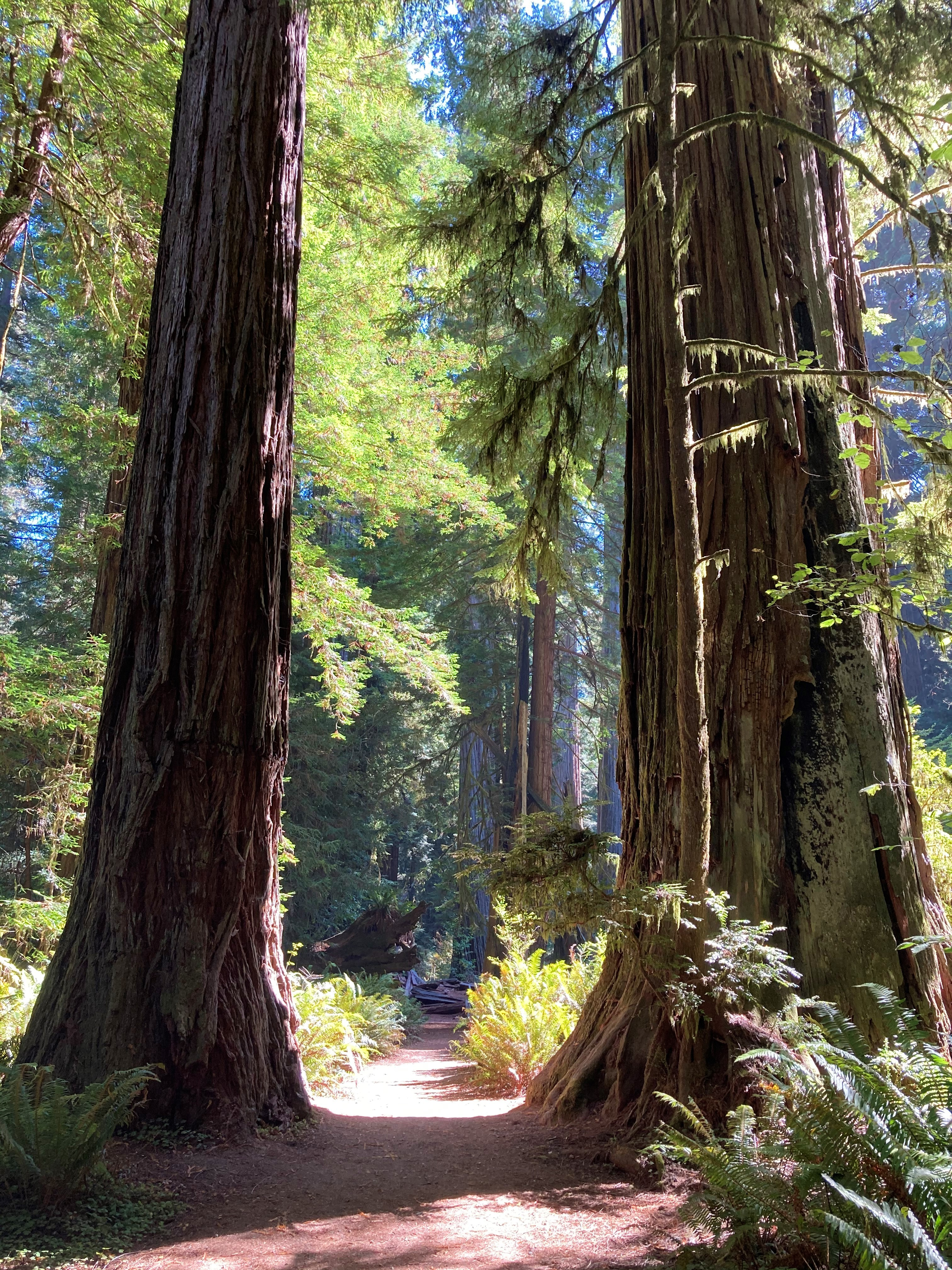
Walking in the Redwood forest

The Smith River is the last major undammed river in California. Within the park, the river is rather undisturbed and holds the state record for the largest steelhead rainbow trout, weighing over 27 pounds (12 kg).

The park plays a large role in preserving a spawning and migration route for the fish, which face threats of habitat degradation in other parts of California.

== Conservation efforts ==
In the mid-1900s, Jedediah Smith Redwood Park was part of a larger discussion on preserving California coastal redwoods. During the 1960s, conservationists and policymakers argued over allowing the lumber industry to gain access to the forests.

In 1966, President Lyndon B Johnson proposed a Redwood National Park which would include the Jedediah Smith Redwood State Park and surrounding land to protect the old growth forests. Notably, the Save-the-Redwoods League advocated for state-level conservation efforts that collaborated with lumber companies rather than federal-level efforts. The Miller Redwood Company was one of many key players who opposed the park’s creation due to the potential loss of jobs. Jedediah Smith Redwood Park played a large role in the redwood conservation movement.

== Recreation ==
The park consists of 18 miles (29 km) of hiking trails and over 100 campsites. Mill Creek flows through the park and merges with the Smith River near the campground. In the warm season, a seasonal bridge is placed across Mill Creek for easier access to Mill Creek Trail and one end of Hiouchi Trail.

The Grove of Titans boardwalk opened along the newly realigned Mill Creek trail in 2022, allowing park visitors low impact access to some of the largest and oldest coast redwoods in the world.

== See also ==
- List of California state parks
- Redwood National and State Parks
- Del Norte Coast Redwoods State Park
- Prairie Creek Redwoods State Park
