= Southern Research Station =

- Logo of the US Forest Service.

Agency overview
- Formed: 1921
- Jurisdiction: Federal Government of the United States
- Headquarters: 200 W.T. Weaver Blvd., Asheville, NC 28804-3454
- Agency executive: Dr. Toral Patel-Weynand (2022), Director
- Parent agency: US Department of Agriculture United States Forest Service
- Website: srs.fs.usda.gov

The Southern Research Station (SRS) is one component of seven units that provide the framework for the US Forest Service (USFS) Research and Development organization. Forest Service R&D is described by the USDA as "...the most extensive natural resources research organization in the world".

== Mission ==
The mission of the Southern Research Station is:

...to engage in high-quality research leading to the scientific and technological advances needed to sustain and enhance forest ecosystems and the full range of benefits they provide.

== History ==
The R&D organization has been part of the USFS mission since the agency was created in 1905. As one of seven units in the USFS R&D organization, the Southern Research Station had its beginnings as two separate entities – the Southern Forest Experiment Station and the Southeastern Forest Experiment Station. During their formative years, major areas of research in these two experiment stations included:

- Mensuration
- Growth & yield
- Harvest and reproduction cutting methods
- Gum naval stores production
- Thinning research in even-aged, second-growth loblolly and shortleaf pine stands
- Forest fire research

=== Southern Forest Experiment Station (SFES) ===
Initiated in 1921, the SFES was responsible for research in southern pine types within the states of South Carolina, Georgia, Florida, Alabama, Mississippi, Louisiana, East Texas and southern Arkansas. The SFES was headquartered in New Orleans, Louisiana.

==== Southern FES directors ====
- R. D. Forbes (1921–1924)
- E. L. Demmon (1924–1944)
- Charles A. Connaughton (1944–1951)
- H. L. Mitchell (1951–1953)
- P. A. Brieglib (1954–1963)
- Walter M. Zillgitt (1963–1966)
- T. C. Nelson (1966–1970)
- R. L. Youngs (1970–1972)
- J. C. Barber (1972–1976)
- L. E. Lassen (1976–1983)
- T. H. Ellis (1984–1992)
- Peter J. Roussopoulos (1992–1995)

=== Southeastern Forest Experiment Station (SEFES) ===
The SEFES began as the Appalachian Station in 1921, with its research scope being generally limited to mountain hardwood types. States within the Appalachian Station included North Carolina, South Carolina, northern Georgia, Virginia, West Virginia, eastern Kentucky, and eastern Tennessee.

After World War II, the Appalachian Station was redesignated as the Southeastern Forest Experiment Station, and research was expanded to include both pine and hardwood types from Florida through Virginia. Headquarters for the Appalachian Station and SEFES were in Asheville, NC.

==== Southeastern FES directors ====
- E. H. Frothingham (1921–1934)
- Clarence A. Forsling (1934–1937)
- Richard E. McArdle (1937–1944)
- I. T. Haig (1944–1951)
- E. L. Demmon (1951–1956)
- Joseph F. Pechanee (1956–1962)
- Thomas F. McLintock (1962–1966)
- Walter M. Zillgitt (1966–1970)
- Stephen G. Boyce (1970–1973)
- J. B. Hillmon (1973–1979)
- Eldon W. Ross (1979–1985)
- Jerry Sesco (1985–1988)
- J. Lamar Beasley (1988–1991)
- Peter J. Roussopoulos (1992–1995)

== Southern Research Station (SRS) ==
In 1995, the Southern and Southeastern Forest Experiment Stations merged to form the Southern Research Station with headquarters in Asheville, North Carolina. Research was expanded into new fields to address "...how climate change, human population growth, invasive plants, pathogens, and fire affect the provision of timber, wildlife, clean air and water, and recreation, as well as other ecosystem services."

Thirteen US states are within the jurisdictional boundaries of the Southern Research Station.

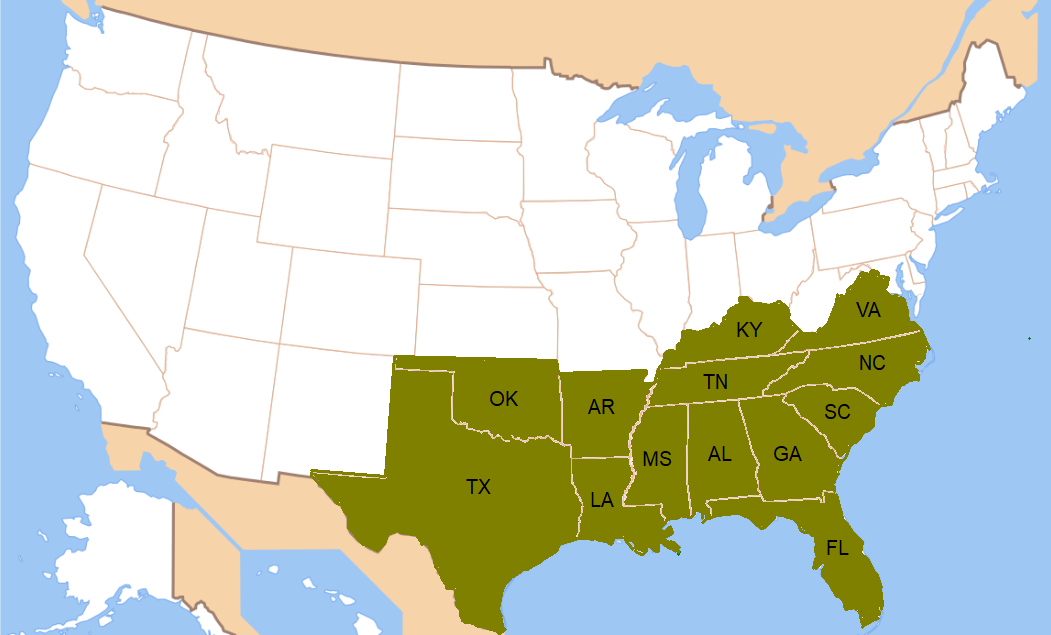
Southeastern US States within the Southern Research Station

- Alabama
- Arkansas
- Florida
- Georgia
- Kentucky
- Louisiana
- Mississippi
- North Carolina
- Oklahoma
- South Carolina
- Tennessee
- Texas
- Virginia

=== SRS directors ===
- Peter J. Roussopoulos (1995–2008)
- Jim Reaves (2008–2010)
- Rob Doudrick (2010–2021)
- Toral Patel-Weynand (2022– )

=== SRS Science Centers and Research Work Units ===
As of 2022, SRS research activities were being conducted within 15 Research Work Units located throughout the southeastern US and were categorized under four scientific objectives or science centers.

SRS Research Work Units within four Science Centers
Science Center	Research Work Unit and contact location
Forest Assessment and Synthesis	•Center for Forest Watershed Research (Otto, NC) •Forest Economics and Policy (Research Triangle Park, NC) •Eastern Forest Environmental Threat Assessment Center (Asheville, NC and Research Triangle Park, NC) •Center for Integrated Forest Science (Raleigh, NC) •Integrating Human and Natural Systems (Athens, GA and Gainesville, FL)
Forest Health and Disturbance	•Center for Forest Disturbance Science (Athens, GA and Clemson, SC) •Forest Genetics and Ecosystems Biology (Saucier, MS) •Insects, Diseases and Invasive Plants of Southern Forests (Athens, GA)
Forest Inventory and Analysis	•Forest Inventory and Analysis (Knoxville, TN)
Forest Restoration and Management	•Center for Bottomland Hardwoods Research (Stoneville, MS) •Upland Hardwood Ecology and Management (Asheville, NC) •Restoring and Managing Longleaf Pine Ecosystems (Monticello, AR) •Southern Pine Ecology and Management (Monticello, AR) •Forest Operations (Auburn, AL) •Utilization of Southern Forest Resources (Auburn, AL)

=== SRS Experimental Forests ===
Within the SRS, there are 20 Experimental forests and/or Rangelands located in nine southeastern states. These experimental forests and rangelands provide a network for conducting long-term research studies and are a treasure trove of accumulated historical sampling data that span a time period of up to 100 years. Experimental forests also serve as education and demonstration sites where researchers interact with students, forest landowners, and forest managers.

Experimental forest	Size (acres)	Location US State	Year established
Escambia	2,990	Alabama	1947
Alum Creek	4,281	Arkansas	1959
Crossett	1,675	Arkansas	1934
Henry R. Koen	720	Arkansas	1951
Sylamore	4,290	Arkansas	1934
Chipola	2,760	Florida	1934
Olustee	3,135	Florida	1934
Hitchiti	4,602	Georgia	1938
Scull Shoals	4,487	Georgia	1961
Palustris	7,515	Louisiana	1935

Experimental forest	Size (acres)	Location US State	Year established
Delta	2,580	Mississippi	1961
Harrison	4,111	Mississippi	1934
Tallahatchie	4,569	Mississippi	1950
Bent Creek	5,242	North Carolina	1925
Blue Valley	1,400	North Carolina	1964
Coweeta	5,482	North Carolina	1934
John C. Calhoun	5,082	South Carolina	1947
Hill Demo Forest	2,690	North Carolina	1947
Santee	6,000	South Carolina	1937
Stephen F. Austin	2,560	Texas	1945

=== Research Natural Areas ===
In 2022, there were 33 established Research Natural Areas (RNA) located within 12 southeastern US states, excluding Tennessee. At least two Research Natural Areas are located within the boundaries of the Southern Research Station's Experimental Forests:

- The Harrison Research Natural Area is located within the Harrison Experimental Forest. This portion of the experimental forest contains 180 acres (73 ha) that were designated as a RNA in 1989. When assessed in 1991, the overstory component within this RNA was 90% longleaf pines (Pinus palustris) that established naturally from seeds after the virgin pine forests were clearcut in the 1920s.
- The R. R. Reynolds Research Natural Area is located within the Crossett Experimental Forest. Other than fire protection, the R.R. Reynolds RNA was set aside from active forest management in 1943 to provide a contrast to managed stands. Based on a 1993 tree inventory, the RRRRNA was described as "... a closed–canopy, mature loblolly pine (Pinus taeda)–hardwood forest", with oaks (Quercus spp.) being the predominant overstory hardwood component. This 80-acre (32 ha) forest area was designated as a RNA in 2005.

== Structural reorganization ==
On July 24, 2025, the US Secretary of Agriculture issued Memorandum SM 1078-015 titled, Department of Agriculture Reorganization Plan. One section of the memorandum specified that, "... the current stand-alone Research Stations would be consolidated into a single location in Fort Collins, Colorado". As a result of that memorandum, the Forest Service proposed the closure of 57 of its 77 research locations throughout the United States, and at least 13 of those locations are scheduled for closure within the Southern Research Station. In a USDA press release dated March 31, 2026, the Secretary of Agriculture announced that, over the course of the next year, the transition phase would begin bringing geographically dispersed Forest Service research stations to Fort Collins, where all scientific research operations would be headquartered under a "unified national research and development organization".

=== SRS research & development facility closures ===
- Huntsville, AL
- Monticello, AR
- Tallahassee, FL
- Lexington, KY
- Pineville, LA
- Leland, MS
- Oxford, MS
- Saucier, MS
- Starkville, MS
- Stoneville, MS
- Clemson & Huger, SC
- Nacogdoches, TX
- Blacksburg, VA

Note: Designated facility closures as of March 2026

=== Authority for the reorganization ===
According to the Secretary of Agriculture:

This Memorandum is issued under the authority of Reorganization Plan No. 2 of 1953 (5 U.S.C. app.; 7 U.S.C. 220 l note) and the Department of Agriculture Reorganization Act of 1994 (Pub. L. I 03-354).

USDA did not seek congressional review before initiating this structural reorganization.

== See also ==
- Bent Creek Campus of the Appalachian Forest Experiment Station
- William Willard Ashe
- Henry E. Hardtner
- Chung-Yun Hse
- Peter Koch (wood scientist)
- John C. Moser
- Carl A. Schenck
