= Beklemishev =

Beklemisnev, feminine: Beklemisneva is a Russian surname of Tatar origin associated with the Russian noble Beklemishev family. Notable people with the surname include:

- Daria Beklemisheva
- Ivan Bersen-Beklemishev
- Nikita Beklemishev Russian nobleman at service of Grand Prince of Moscow Ivan III of Russia
- Vladimir Nikolayevich Beklemishev, a Soviet zoologist
- Vladimir Aleksandrovich Beklemishev, a Russian sculptor
