= Natalia Aleksandrovna Filippova =

USSR-Russian acarologist

- Наталия Александровна Филиппова
- Born: February 15, 1930; Moscow, USSR
- Died: January 7, 2018 (aged 87); St. Petersburg, Russia
- Scientific career
- Fields: study of mites and ticks
- Thesis: MSc: The identification of the immature stages of Ixodes ticks. PhD: The morphology and taxonomy of the Ixodinae.
- Doctoral advisors: Maria V. Pospelova-Shtrom Vsevolod B. Dubinin and Aleksander S. Monchadsky

Natalia Aleksandrovna Filippova (Russian: Наталия Александровна Филиппова; 15 February 1930 – 5 January 2018) was a world authority on the taxonomy of mites and especially ticks. Her monographs on the identification, morphology, development, distribution and behaviour of the family Argasidae (soft ticks) and the sub-families of Ixodinae and Amblyomminae (hard ticks) are standard works on these important vectors of disease.

== Education and personal life ==
Filippova was born in 1930 in Moscow in the USSR. In 1947 she began her studies at Moscow State University followed by advanced study in medical entomology in the Department of Entomology with Aleksei Zachvatkin, Vladimir Beklemishev and especially Evgenii S. Smirnov. In 1952 she was awarded an M.Sc., followed by her Ph.D. in 1955. During this research she worked with Maria V. Pospelova-Shtrom, Vsevolod B. Dubinin and Aleksander S. Monchadsky on the identification of immature Ixodes hard ticks and the taxonomy of ticks in general. She died in St Petersburg in 2018.

== Career ==
Filippova specialised in acarology, the study of ticks and mites that carry diseases between humans such as typhus and Lyme disease. In 1955 she moved to the Zoological Institute of the Academy of Sciences of the USSR in Leningrad, where she worked for over 60 years. She began work that led to a monograph about the argasid ticks of the Palearctic region published in 1966 in the Fauna of the USSR academic series. She undertook field work throughout the Soviet Union until the 1990s, rearing ticks in the laboratory in order to study all their behaviour and developmental stages. Her work on the Ixodes genus led to taxonomic revisions. She focused especially on Ixodes persulcatus and closely related species, not only from a taxonomic perspective but their role in transmitting the agent of Lyme disease. This led to the concept of the persulcatus group. She acted as editor-in-chief for a United Nations Educational, Scientific and Cultural Organization monograph on this group in the international programme Man and the Biosphere. Later in her career she applied scanning electron microscopy to the analysis of the shape of ticks.

== Publications ==
Filippova was the author or co-author of three monographs as well as over 130 scientific publications and conference articles. They include:

- Monographs by N.A. Filippova:
  - 1997 Fauna of Russia. Arachnida, Vol. 4, Part 5: Subfamily Amblyomminae (in Russian)
  - 1977 Fauna of the USSR. Arachnida, Vol. 4, Part 4: Subfamily Ixodinae (in Russian)
  - 1966 Fauna of the USSR. Arachnida, Vol. 4, Part 3: Argasid ticks (Argasidae) (in Russian)
- Scientific publications:
  - N.A. Filippova (2017) History of the species range of ixodid ticks, vectors of pathogens with natural nidality (Acari, Ixodidae), as a prerequisite of their intraspecific biodiversity. Entomological Review 97 255 – 275.
  - D.A. Apanaskevitch, N.A. Filippova and I.G. Horak (2010) The genus Hyalomma Koch, 1844. X. redescription of all parasitic stages of H. (Euhyalomma) scupense Schulze, 1919 (= H. detritum Schulze) (Acari: Ixodidae) and notes on its biology. Folia Parasitologica 57 69 - 78.
  - N.A. Filippova (1999) The sympatry of closely related species of ixodid ticks and its possible role in the parasitic systems of natural foci of transmissible diseases (in Russian) Parazitologiia 33 223 - 241.
  - M. Zahler, N.A. Filippova, P.C. Morel, R. Gothe and H. Rinder (1997) Relationships between species of the Rhipicephalus sanguineus group: a molecular approach. Journal of Parasitology 83 302 - 306.
  - N.A. Filippova (1990) The taxonomic aspects of the transmission of the causative agent of Lyme disease (in Russian) Parazitologiia 24 257 - 267.
  - N.A. Filippova (1973) On species of Ixodes persulcatus group (Parasitiformes, Ixodidae), VII. Paleogenesis of the southern branch of the Ixodes persulcatus group and interrelations with I. ricinus (L.) N. (in Russian) Parazitologiia. 3 3 – 13.

She published descriptions of 11 new species of ticks (Anomalohimalaya lotozkyi, Argas latus, Argas macrostigmatus, Argas tridentatus, Argas vulgaris, Dermacentor montanus, Dermacentor ushakovae, Ixodes ghilarovi, Ixodes sachalinensis, Ixodes stromi and Ixodes subterranus) as well as identifying new areas where previously known ticks could be found.

== Honours and awards ==
In 1993 Filippova received the E.N. Pavlovsky award from the Russian Academy of Sciences for her work on mites. In 2015 the ixodid tick Dermacentor filippovae Apanaskevich & Apanaskevich was named after her.
