= Harrison Experimental Forest =

Mississippi experimental forest facility

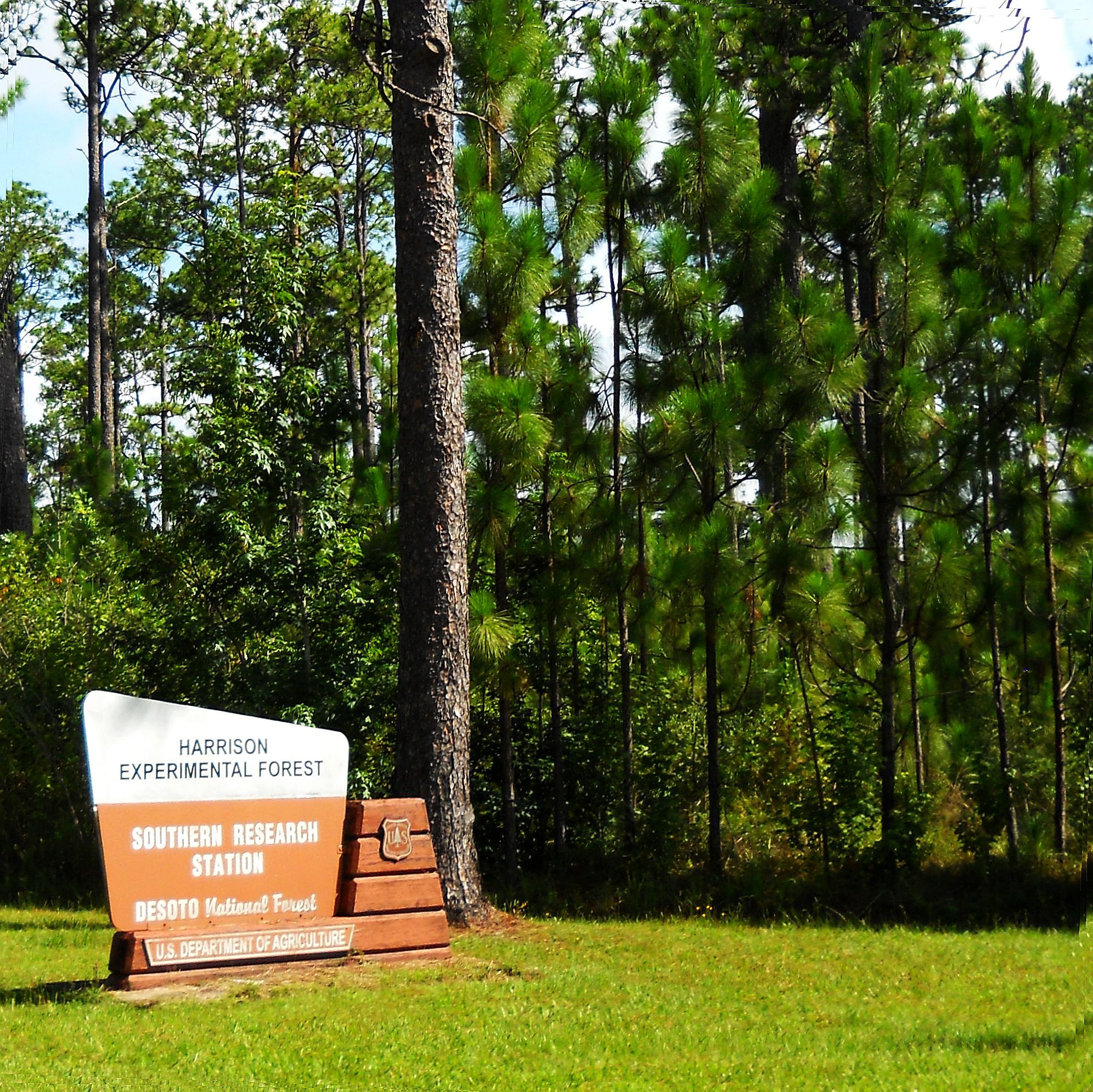
- Highway entrance sign at the Harrison Experimental Forest headquarters

- Location within Mississippi Location within the United States
- Location: Harrison County, Mississippi, United States
- Nearest city: Gulfport, Mississippi
- Coordinates: 30°37′36″N 89°03′18″W
- Area: 4,107 acres (1,662 ha)
- Established: July 19, 1934
- Governing body: USFS, Southern Research Station

Harrison Experimental Forest is an experimental forest facility operated by the Southern Research Station (SRS) of the United States Forest Service in Harrison County, Mississippi. The experimental forest is located within the De Soto National Forest about 25 mi (40 km) north of Gulfport, Mississippi off Old Mississippi Highway 67.

== History ==
Before construction of railroads and establishment of settlements in the southern United States in the latter half of the 19th century, the longleaf pine ecosystem (Pinus palustris) dominated the landscape and extended from Virginia south and west into East Texas through nine US states, covering an area of more than 140,000 mi^{2} (360,000 km^{2}). Numerous sawmill communities sprang up along newly constructed railroads to meet the increasing demand for processed lumber. By the 1930s, this vast resource of virgin pines had been depleted in south Mississippi. Although the land was excellent for pine growth, the poor soils of south Mississippi proved to be worthless for growing agricultural row crops, thus creating a barren landscape.

In an effort to conserve these cutover lands, the US government bought up thousands of acres in south Mississippi under the Weeks Act during the 1930s. These lands were consolidated into what would become the De Soto National Forest. In 1933, a tract of 3,850 acres (1,560 ha) was set aside as the Harrison Experimental Forest for conducting long-term silvicultural research.

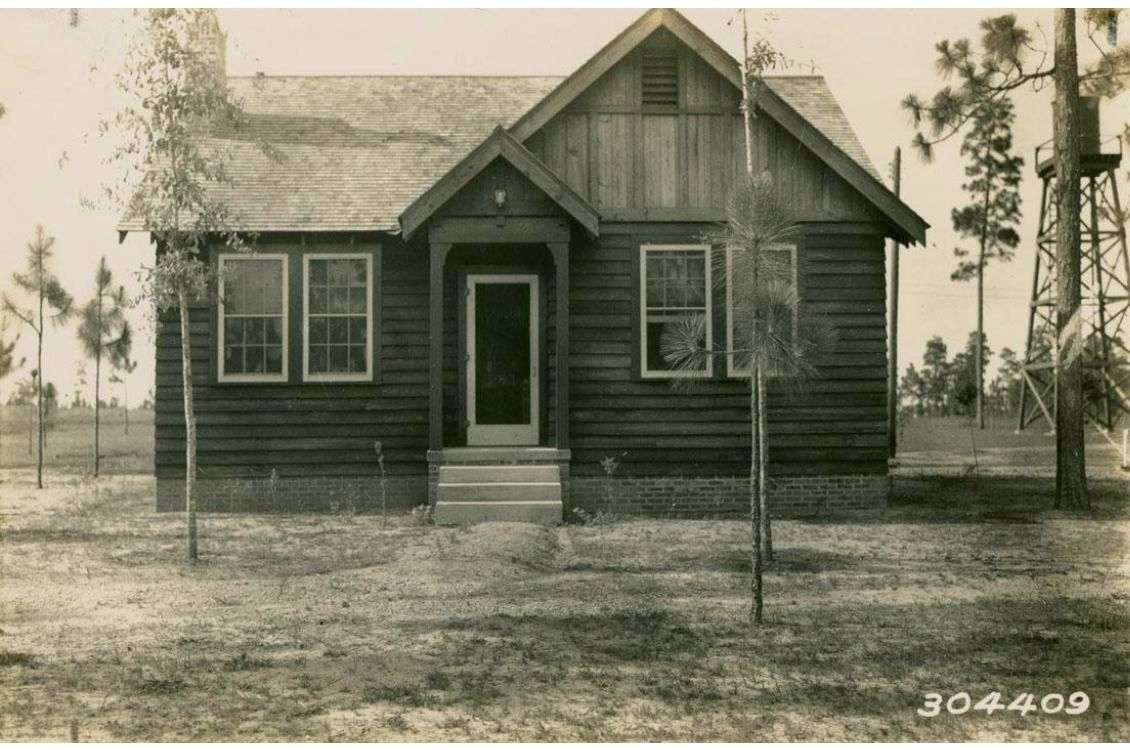
Office building on the Harrison Experimental Forest in 1935

By 1934, numerous buildings – a residence, office/lab, greenhouse, equipment depot, and garage – were under construction or had been completed on the experimental forest by the Civil Works Administration. Concurrently, the Civilian Conservation Corps landscaped the grounds at the headquarters area and constructed fences plus more than 11 mi (18 km) of roads on the experimental forest.

== Research ==
The earliest research studies conducted on the experimental forest were related to forest fire behavior and wood preservation. By 1939, researchers at the experimental forest were the first to have initiated the use of water spray as a preservative for log storage at sawmills. Researchers were also credited with developing preservative treatment of wooden fence posts to increase their longevity.

Other major areas of research on the experimental forest included studies of pathological diseases. In the late 1940s, research was initiated into brown-spot needle blight (Mycosphaerella dearnessii) in longleaf pine, fusiform rust (Cronartium fusiforme) in loblolly (Pinus taeda) and slash (Pinus elliottii) pines, littleleaf disease (Phytophthora cinnamomi) in shortleaf (Pinus echinata) pines and black root rot (Macrophomina phaseolina) of pine seedlings in nurseries.

In the 1950s, the main focus of research at the experimental forest evolved to address problems associated with matching tree seed sources to sites in need of regeneration.

=== Southern Institute of Forest Genetics ===
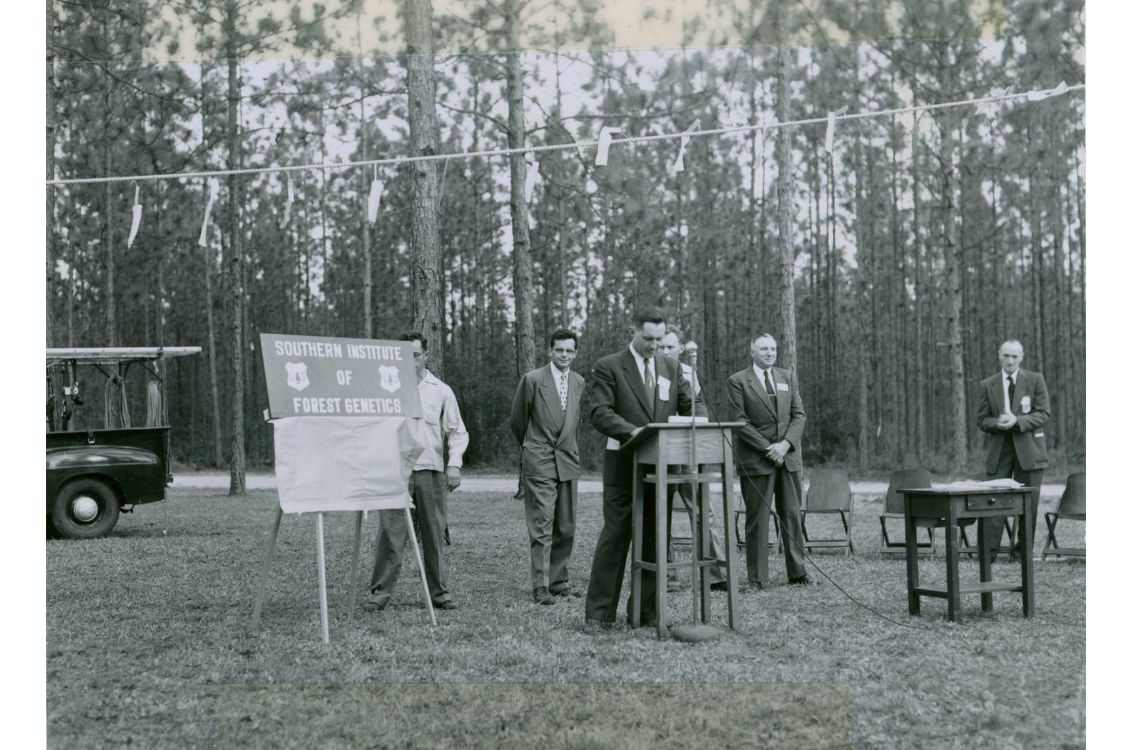
Dedication 1955

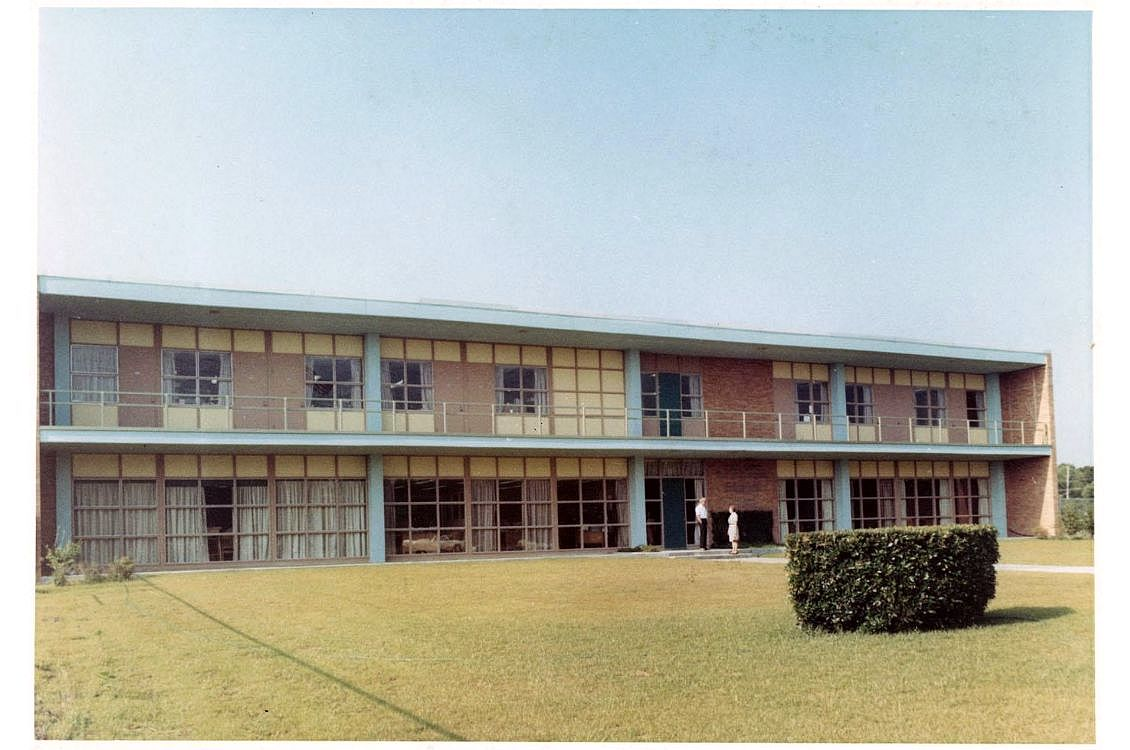
Gulfport facility 1962

Southern Institute of Forest Genetics

In 1954, the Southern Forest Experiment Station announced that the Harrison Experimental Forest would become home to the Southern Institute of Forest Genetics. Formal dedication of the Institute was held at the experimental forest on March 3, 1955. By 1960, a new laboratory facility opened in Gulfport, MS to house project scientists, but actual field research continued at the experimental forest.

During the 1970s, the Gulfport facility housed 19 scientists who investigated genetics and disease resistance. In 1992, the Gulfport facility closed because of changing budget priorities; by then, scientists had relocated to the Harrison Experimental Forest.

In 2022, the mission of the Research Work Unit at the Harrison Experimental Forest was:

To advance the scientific understanding of the roles of genetics, environment, and their interactions to provide guidelines and tools for improving the sustainable productivity of southern forest ecosystems.

=== Research Natural Area ===
The Harrison Research Natural Area was established in 1989 and encompasses 180 acres (73 ha) within the Harrison Experimental Forest. When assessed in 1991, 90% of the overstory component was an undisturbed stand of longleaf pines that seeded naturally during clearcutting in the 1920s.

== Gallery ==
=== Harrison Experimental Forest headquarters area ===
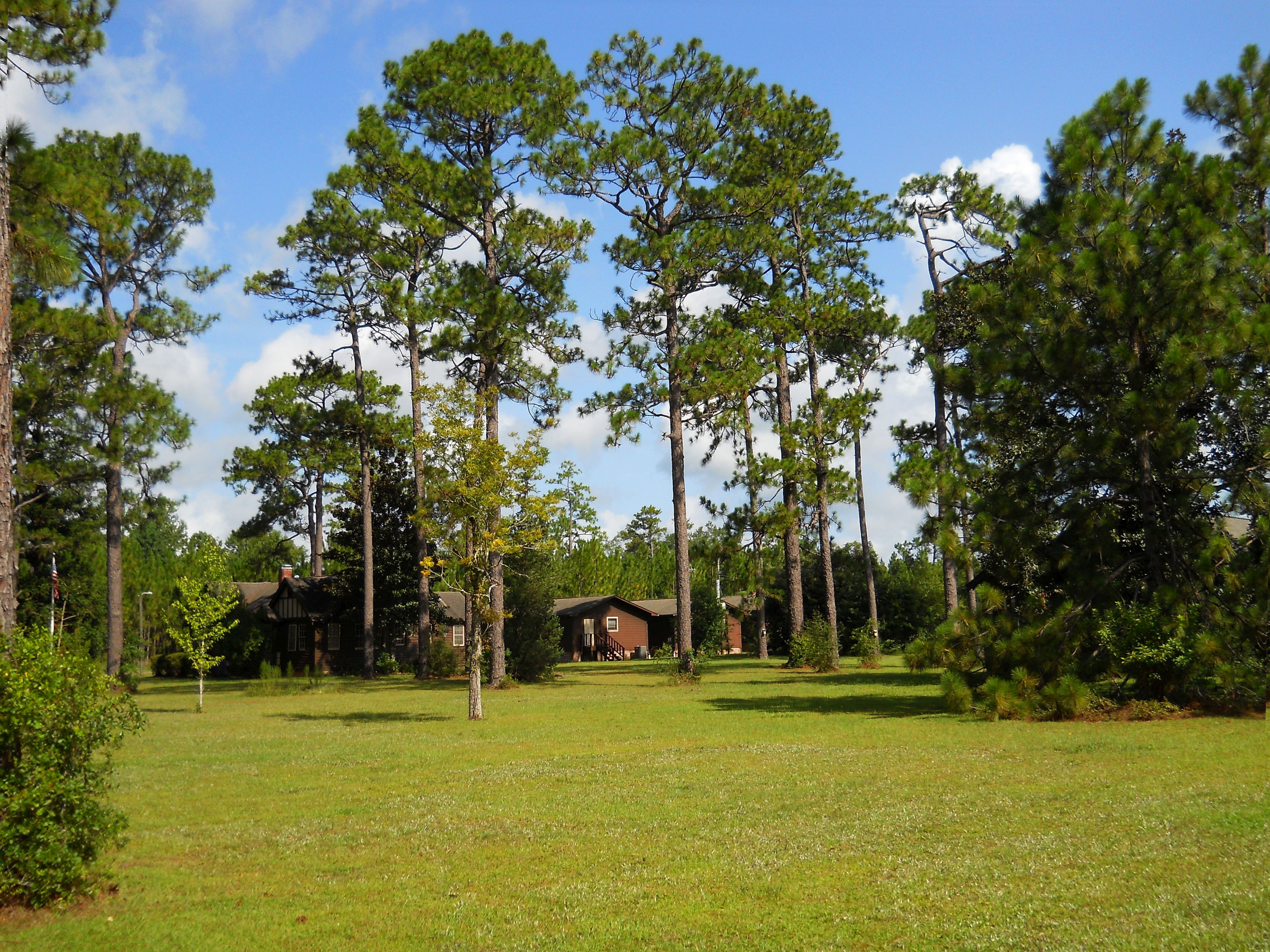
Headquarters facilities

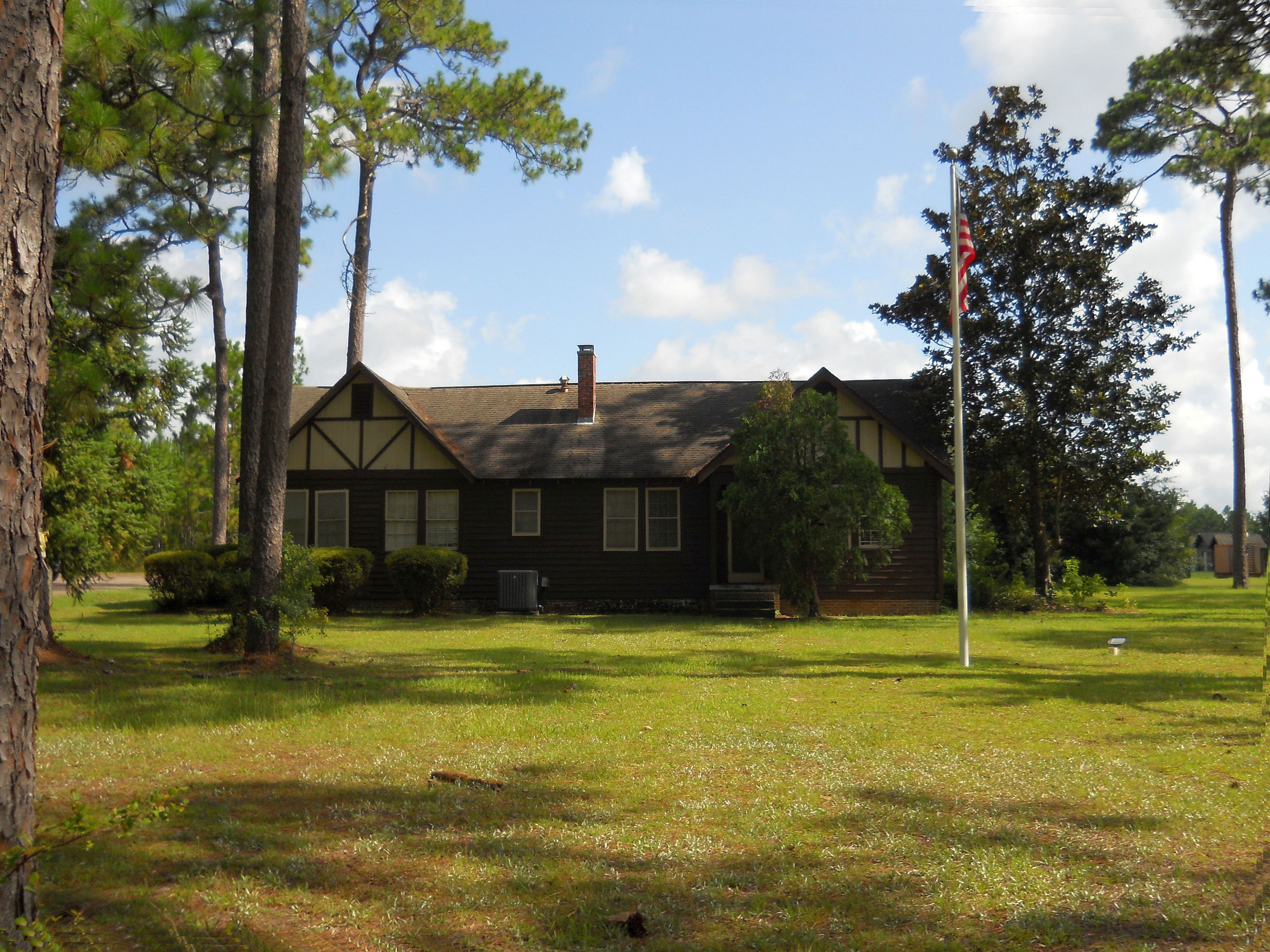
Administrative building

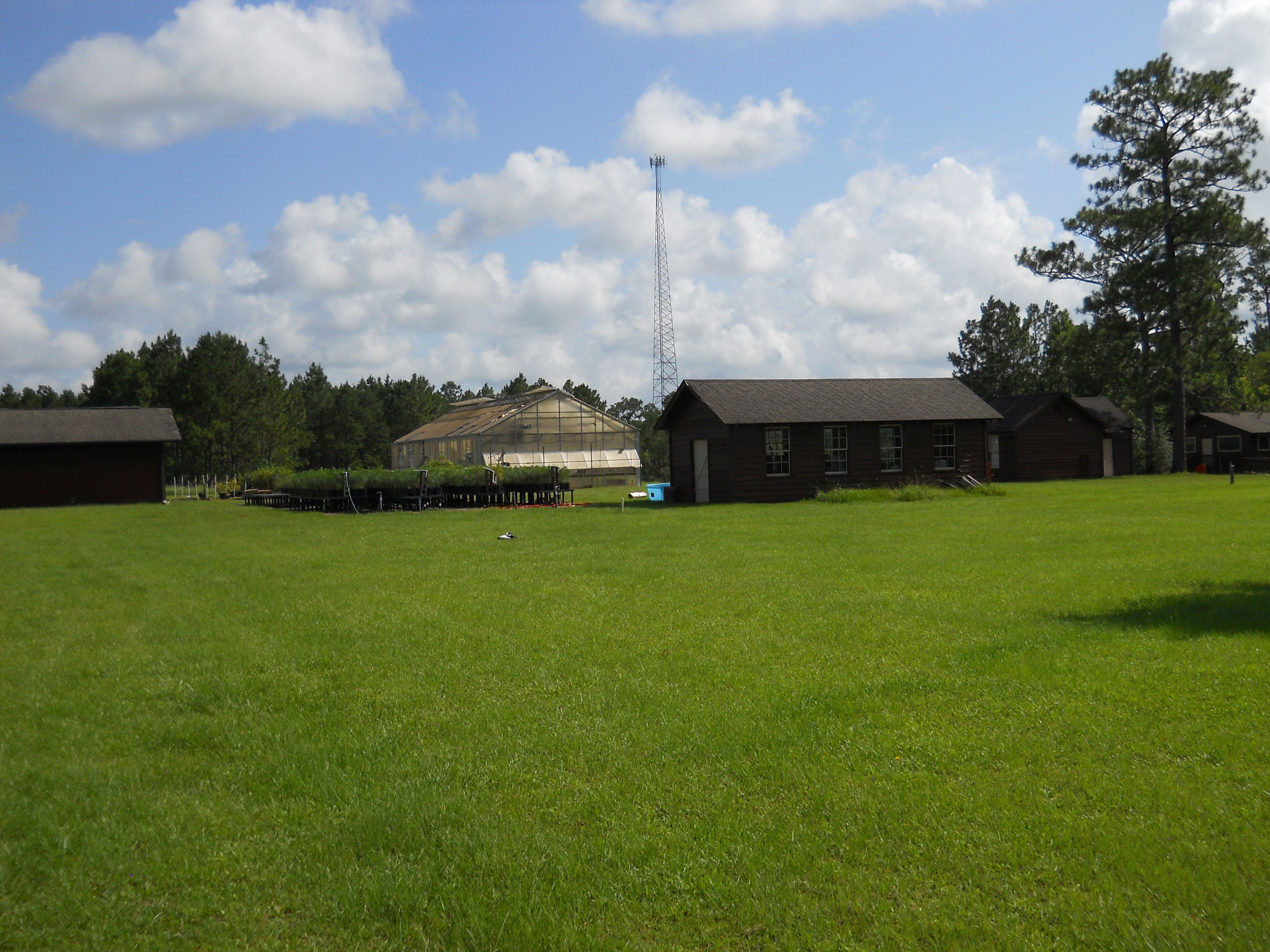
Greenhouse facilities
