= Systematic & Applied Acarology Society =

The Systematic & Applied Acarology Society is an international society dedicated to promoting the development of the scientific discipline of acarology (the study of mites and ticks) and facilitating collaboration among acarologists around the world. Founded in 1996, the society publishes three serial publications: the Acarology Bulletin, a newsletter of the society; Systematic & Applied Acarology, a refereed research journal; and Systematic and Applied Acarology Special Publications, a rapid publication for short papers and monographic works which was merged with the journal in 2012. It also occasionally issues books of special interest to members, and maintains an online acarological e-reprint library for acarologists around the world.

== Official Website ==
- Official website
