= Crossett Experimental Forest =

Experimental forest in Arkansas, USA

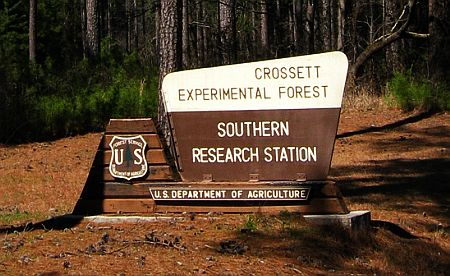
- Location sign

- Location within Arkansas Location within the United States
- Location: Ashley County, Arkansas, United States
- Nearest city: Crossett, Arkansas
- Coordinates: 33°02′01″N 91°56′19″W
- Area: 1,680 acres (680 ha)
- Established: 1934
- Website: Crossett Experimental Forest website

Crossett Experimental Forest is an experimental forest operated by the Southern Research Station (SRS) of the United States Forest Service in Ashley County, Arkansas. It is managed out of the SRS office in Monticello, Arkansas, with onsite facilities about 6.8 miles (10.9 km) south of Crossett, Arkansas off Arkansas Highway 133.

== Description ==
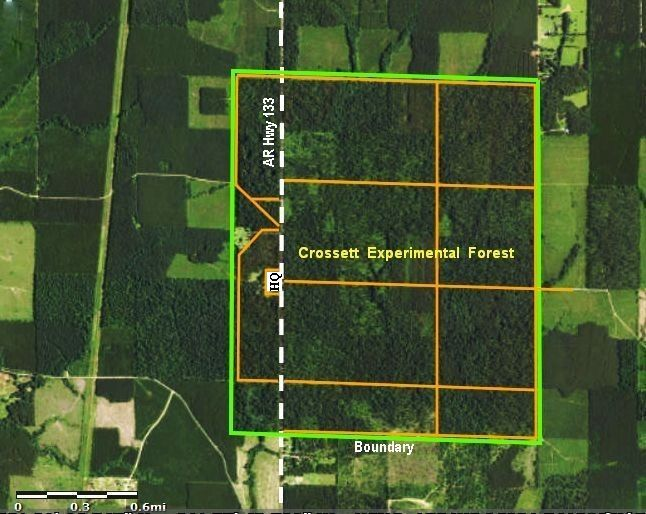
Aerial view of Crossett Experimental Forest boundary and road system

The forest contains 1,680 acres (680 ha) that were given to the U.S. Forest Service by the Crossett Lumber Company (later merged into Georgia-Pacific) in 1934. The tract is used for research into forestry management practices principally involving Pinus taeda and P. echinata. It includes one area, the 80-acre (32 ha) Reynolds Natural Area that has received little human intervention since the forest was established. The remainder of the land is managed according to a variety of practices seeking to maximize timber yields.

== History ==
The virgin forests of northern Louisiana and southern Arkansas were virtually depleted by 1930 due to lumbering activities over the preceding forty years. During this time, little regard was given to sustainable forestry practices, and the land that was logged was usually sold off for agricultural uses. With the prospect of complete collapse of its logging activities, the Crossett Lumber Company decided to donate this parcel to the United States Forest Service as a research station. Under the agreement, the Forest Service was committed to return to the company an amount of lumber equal to what it had at the time of the donation. Land for the research forest was selected in 1933, and by the end of that year, CCC crews began work on facilities in the selected parcels. This work included roads, office facilities, and research and equipment buildings. CCC crews were also used to inventory the forest's timber assets in detail.

Three buildings constructed by the CCC in 1939 and 1940 have survived, and are now listed on the National Register of Historic Places (NRHP). Located at the main complex off Arkansas Highway 133, these are Building #2 – a garage and storage facility, Building #6 – an office building/shop, and Building #8 – a residence.

The experimental forest is administratively affiliated with the Ouachita National Forest through the Jessieville and Winona Ranger District.

== NRHP gallery ==
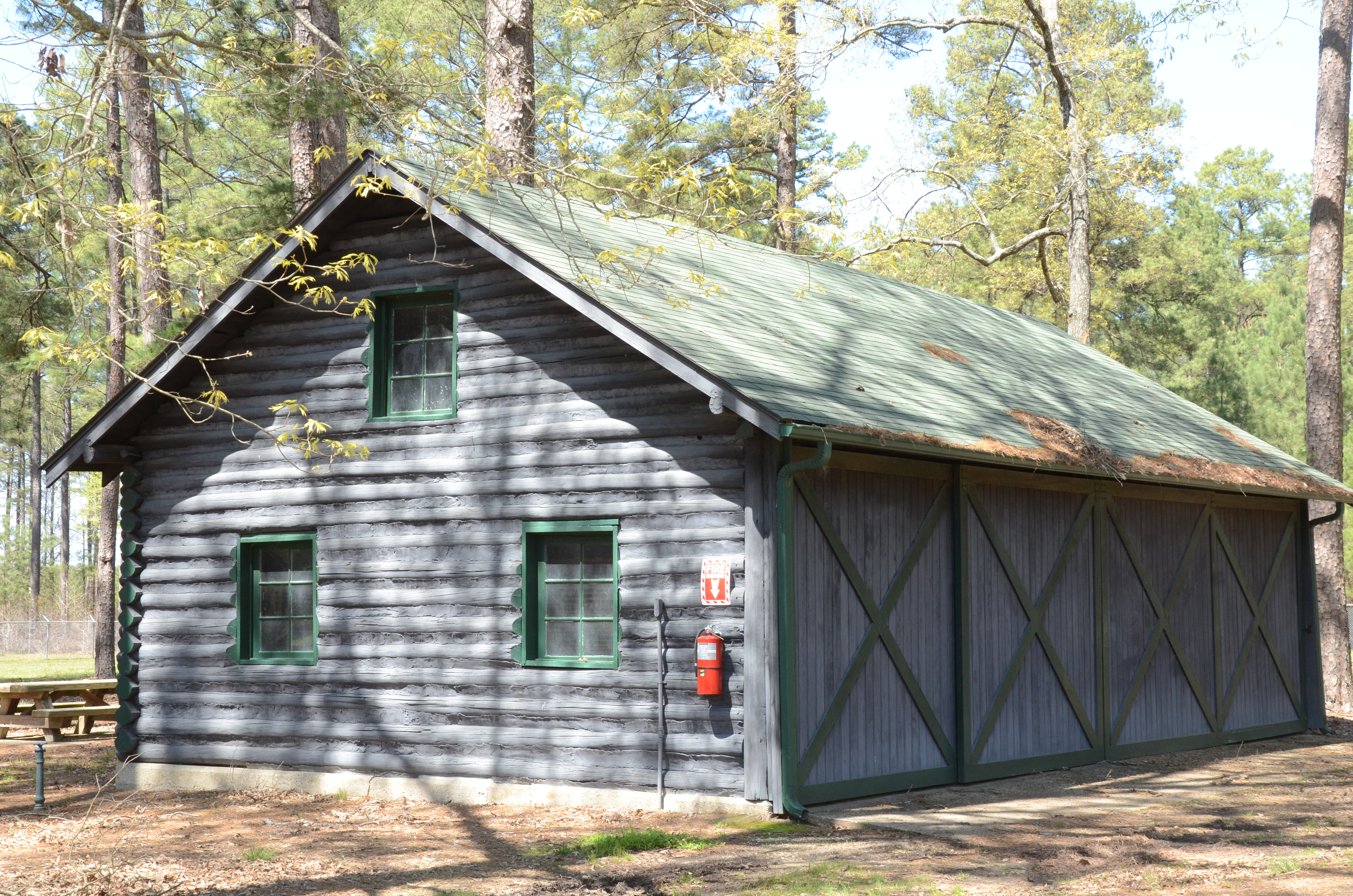
Building No. 2

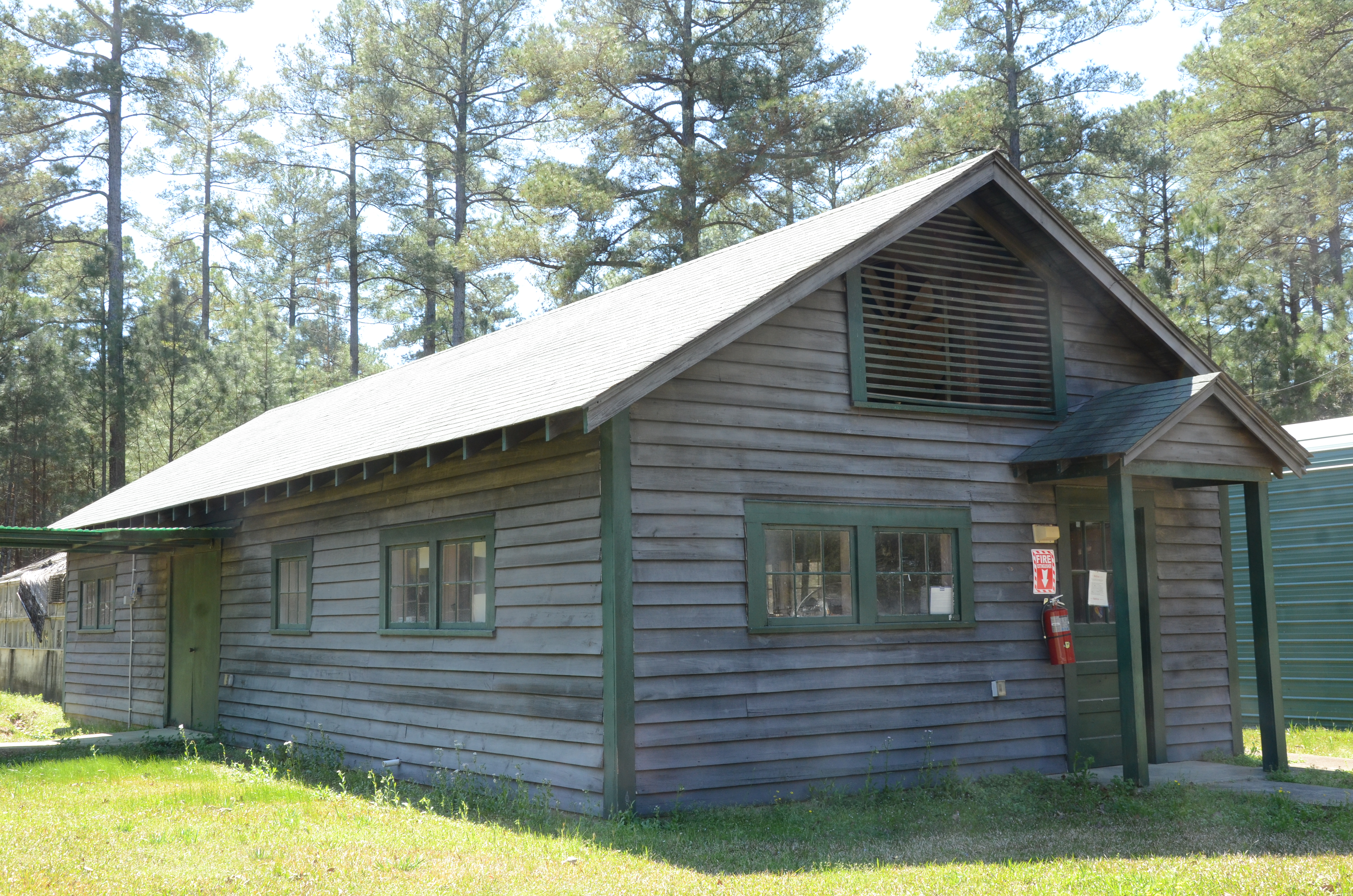
Building No. 6

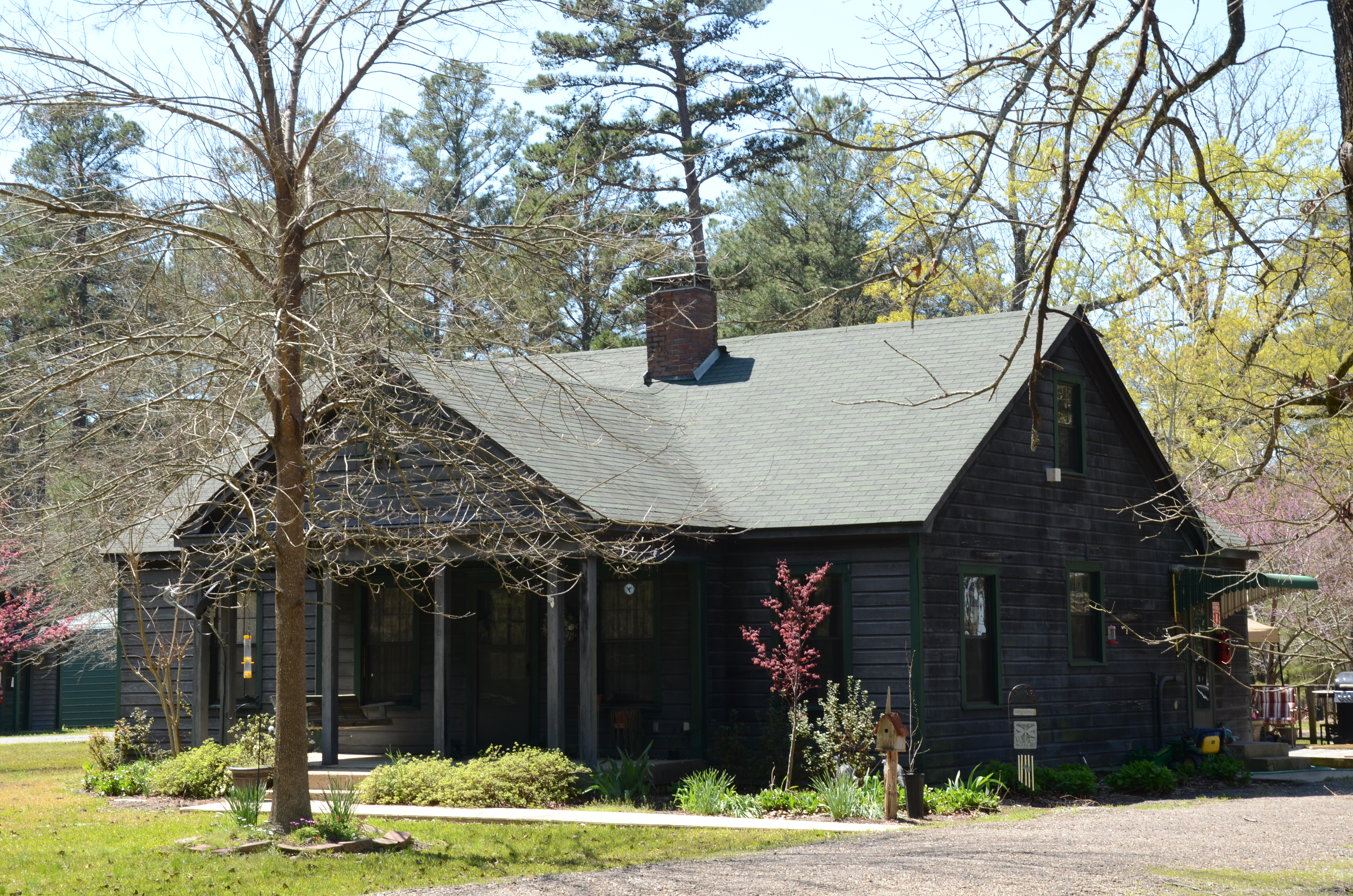
Building No. 8
