= Peter Koch =

Peter Koch may refer to:

- Pete Koch (born 1962), American actor and American football player
- Peter Koch (wood scientist) (1920–1998), American engineer and wood scientist
- Peter Rutledge Koch (born 1943), American letterpress printmaker and publisher
