= Experimental and Applied Acarology =

- Discipline: Acarology
- Language: English
- Edited by: Maurice W. Sabelis

Publication details
- History: 1985-present
- Publisher: Springer Science+Business Media
- Frequency: Monthly
- Impact factor: 1.760 (2016)

Standard abbreviations
- ISO 4: Exp. Appl. Acarol.

Indexing
- CODEN: EAACEM
- ISSN: 0168-8162 (print); 1572-9702 (web)
- OCLC no.: 37785917

Links
- Journal homepage; Online archive

Experimental and Applied Acarology is a monthly peer-reviewed scientific journal covering all aspects of acarology. It was established in 1985 and is published by Springer Science+Business Media. The editor-in-chief is Maurice W. Sabelis (University of Amsterdam).

== Abstracting and indexing ==
The journal is abstracted and indexed in:

- Science Citation Index
- Index medicus/MEDLINE/PubMed
- Scopus
- EMBASE
- Chemical Abstracts Service
- CAB International
- Academic OneFile
- AGRICOLA
- Biological Abstracts
- BIOSIS Previews
- CAB Abstracts
- Current Contents/Agriculture, Biology & Environmental Sciences
- Elsevier Biobase
- EMBiology
- GEOBASE
- Global Health
- The Zoological Record
