= Vladimir Beklemishev =

Vladimir Beklemishev may refer to:

- Vladimir Nikolayevich Beklemishev, a Soviet zoologist
- Vladimir Aleksandrovich Beklemishev, a Russian sculptor
