= Haemaphysalis pospelovashtromae =

Scientific classification
- Kingdom: Animalia
- Phylum: Arthropoda
- Subphylum: Chelicerata
- Class: Arachnida
- Order: Ixodida
- Family: Ixodidae
- Genus: Haemaphysalis
- Species: H. pospelovashtromae

Binomial name
- Haemaphysalis pospelovashtromae Hoogstraal, 1966

Species of tick

Haemaphysalis pospelovashtromae, Pospelova-Shtrom’s USSR mountain haemaphysalid, is an ixodid tick native to Kyrgyzstan, Turkmenistan, Tajikistan, and the Republic of Georgia that parasitizes cattle and goats. The species epithet honors parasitologist Dr. Maria V. Pospelova-Shtrom.

H. pospelovashtromae is a moderately large haemaphysalid, the adult males averaging 2.7 mm in length and 1.4 mm in width, and unengorged adult females 3.4 mm in length and 2.8 mm in width. When unengorged, they are of a yellowish color. The conscutum of the male is pear-shaped, and the scutum of the female is slightly longer than wide with the outline widest at the anterior third of the length and gradually converging to a moderately pointed posterior margin. The posterior margin of the idiosoma has 11 festoons.
