= Acarologia =

Study of Revaluation of organisms in environments

- Discipline: Acarology
- Language: English
- Edited by: Serge Kreiter

Publication details
- History: 1959-present
- Frequency: Quarterly
- Open access: Yes
- License: CC BY
- Impact factor: 1.047 (2018)

Standard abbreviations
- ISO 4: Acarologia

Indexing
- CODEN: ACRLAW
- ISSN: 0044-586X (print); 2107-7207 (web)
- LCCN: 65085523
- OCLC no.: 782068715

Links
- Journal homepage; Online access; Online archive

Acarologia is a quarterly, peer-reviewed, open-access scientific journal covering all aspects of acarology. It was established by Marc André and François Grandjean in 1959 to promote research in acarology. The editor-in-chief is Serge Kreiter (INRA, Montpellier).

== Abstracting and indexing ==
The journal is abstracted and indexed in:

- PASCAL
- Current Awareness in Biological Sciences
- Scopus
- The Zoological Record
- BIOSIS Previews
