= Maria V. Pospelova-Shtrom =

20th century parasitologist

- Born: 3 January 1902; Russian Empire
- Died: 1 January 1991 (aged 88); Kiev, Ukrainian SSR, USSR
- Scientific career
- Workplaces: Institute of Medical Parasitology and Tropical Medicine, Moscow

Maria Vladimirovna Pospelova-Shtrom (Russian: Мария Владимировна Поспелова-Штром; 1902–1991) was a 20th century parasitologist best known for her work delineating the biology and public health importance of ticks in western Asia and eastern Europe, contributing to the reduction of the incidence of tick-borne diseases, especially tick-borne relapsing fever.

== Career ==
After earning her Doctor of Biological Sciences degree, Pospelova-Shtrom rose to the position of head of the tick laboratory in the department of medical entomology at the Institute of Medical Parasitology and Tropical Medicine. During her career, she carried out classical studies of the foci of tick-borne spirochetosis, focusing on the morphology, taxonomic characteristics, and population ecology of the tick vectors. She was the first to develop science-based anti-epidemic measures against outbreaks of the tick-borne diseases, and developed the guidelines used by the sanitary-epidemiological service to combat the vector ticks. Her work contributed broadly to the reduction in incidence of tick-borne spirochetosis in the areas studied.

Under her leadership, 36 scientific expeditions were undertaken in Central Asia, Kazakhstan, the Caucasus and central Russia. She amassed a vast amount of material about the morphology, field ecology, and experimental ecology of the soft-bodied argasid ticks; revised the systematics of the tick family Argasidae; and authored a book on ornithodorine ticks and their epidemiological significance that was translated into English by the US Department of Commerce.

As a leading subject-matter expert in acarology, she collaborated with the World Health Organization, and participated in the first international meeting on ticks and their transmitted diseases, held in Geneva, Switzerland, and the eighth international congress on parasitology, held in Tehran, Iran. Her lectures in medical parasitology trained workers from outlying areas of the Soviet Union and tropical parasitologists sent to work in developing countries. Under her academic leadership, over 20 graduate degree candidates' theses were defended, and over 10 doctors of sciences were graduated.

During her career, Pospelova-Shtrom authored 94 scientific papers and four extensive monographs that made noteworthy contributions to the field of acarology. She was a colleague of many of the pioneering researchers of the era, including Y. N. Pavlovsky, V. N. Beklemishev, P. G. Sergeev, V. P. Pospelov, L. M. Isaev, B. I. Pomerantsev, Zh. K. Shtrom, botanist L. N. Tyulina, and others.

== Personal ==
Maria Vladimirovna Pospelova was born on January 3, 1902. In 1924, she married Zhan Krishevich Shtrom, a veteran of World War I, in which service he had been seriously wounded. After graduating from the Leningrad Medical Institute, he worked in the Department of Parasitology at the Bacteriological Institute Pasteur in Leningrad, was head of the Department of Geomatology of the Department of Medical Parasitology at the All-Union Institute of Experimental Medicine, and the All-Union Institute of Helminthology as head of the Central Helminthological Museum. In 1941 during the Stalinist repressions, he was arrested and charged with anti-Soviet agitation and propaganda, and died on March 12, 1942, in Prison No. 1 in Sverdlovsk. In 1956, he was exonerated by the Moscow city prosecutor. He and Maria were the parents of a daughter. Pospelova-Shtrom died on January 1, 1991, 2 days before her 89th birthday. She is interred in Baikove Cemetery in Kyiv, Ukraine near the grave of her father, entomologist Vladimir Petrovich Pospelov.

== Ticks originally circumscribed by Pospelova-Shtrom ==
- Argas beklemischevi, Pospelova-Shtrom, Vasil'yeva & Semashko, 1963
- Haemaphysalis erinacei turanica, Pospelova-Shtrom, 1940
- Haemaphysalis pavlovskyi, Pospelova-Shtrom, 1935
- Haemaphysalis pentalagi, Pospelova-Shtrom, 1935, the "Japanese black-rabbit haemaphysalid"

== Tick named in Pospelova-Shtrom's honor ==
- Haemaphysalis pospelovashtromae, Hoogstraal, 1966
