= Barry OConnor =

Barry OConnor is an American acarologist. He is Professor Emeritus at the University of Michigan and Curator Emeritus of its zoology museum. He is an expert on mites and ticks, their evolution, systematics and ecology, including interactions with their hosts.

== Education ==
OConnor obtained his Bachelor of Science (with distinction) from Iowa State University in 1971 and then was drafted into the Vietnam War. After finishing his military service, he attended Cornell University, where he received his doctorate in 1981. His doctoral research was to do the first phylogenetic analysis of family groups within the Astigmata, a large group of mites. He then completed a postdoc at UC Berkeley.

== Career ==
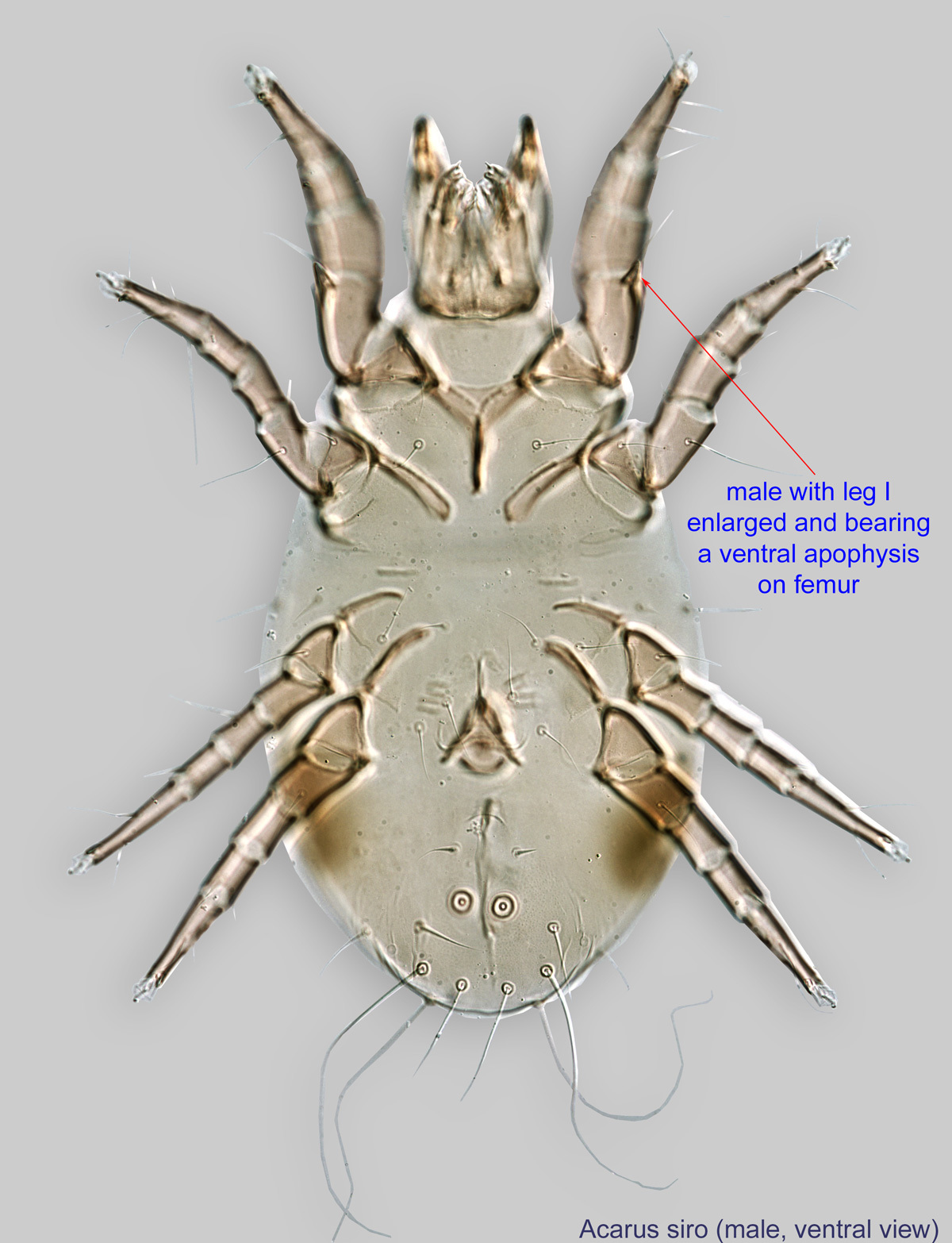
Grain mite (Acarus siro) collected by Barry OConnor from pig feed on a farm in Michigan.

OConnor joined the University of Michigan faculty in 1980 as an assistant professor and assistant curator at the Museum of Zoology, which is not open to the public. He become a full professor and curator in 2001. He later became Associate Chair of Biology as well as Associate Chair of Ecology and Evolutionary Biology. He has also been a visiting professor at Ohio State University (Acarology Summer Program), and at Escuela Nacional de Ciencias Biologicas, Instituto Politecnico Nacional in Mexico City.

OConnor has published over 180 peer-reviewed research articles based on mites collected and studied from around the world. His has received ten research grants, including grants from the National Science Foundation and the U.S. Department of Agriculture (USDA). OConnor's research has led to the discovery and description of numerous new mite taxa, including three subfamilies, one tribe, 34 genera, and 255 species. He became president of the Acarological Society of America in 1985.

OConnor significantly expanded the mite collection at the University of Michigan Museum of Zoology. He increased the collection from approximately 300 specimens to over 400,000 slides and 70,000 alcohol lots through his own collecting efforts and the acquisition of collections from retired colleagues. In conjunction with the USDA he released a website to aid in assisting the identification of mites associated with bees into the public domain.

In 2013, he published a paper on dust mites that challenged Dollo's law, the idea that once a species becomes parasitic it cannot evolve to become non-parasitic. The paper showed that free-living dust mites evolved from parasitic ancestors.

Several mite taxa have been named in honor of OConnor, including the family Oconnoriidae and the genus Oconnoria (type species: Oconnoria inexpectata, which is a quill mite of owls in the Philippines).

The following species were also named after him, the majority of which he collected:

- Steneotarsonemus oconnori Delfinado, 1976 - grass mite
- Coccipolipus oconnori Husband, 1989 - ladybug beetle parasite
- Bregetovia oconnori Mironov, Dabert & Atyeo, 1993 - sandpiper feather mite
- Myotrombicula oconnori Brown 1997 - bat chigger
- Paradactylidium oconnori Goldarazena, Ochoa & Jordana, 1999 - beetle parasite
- Adenoepicrius oconnori Moraza, 2005 - soil mite
- Pterotrogus oconnori Mironov, 2006 - pileated woodpecker feather mite
- Pandalura oconnori Mironov, 2011 - oilbird feather mite
- Klinckowstroemia oconnori, Villegas-Guzman, Reyes-Castillo & Perez, 2011 - passalid beetle mite
- Listrophoroides oconnori Bochkov, 2011 - Laotian limestone-rat fur mite
