= Palustris Experimental Forest =

Experimental forest in Louisiana, USA

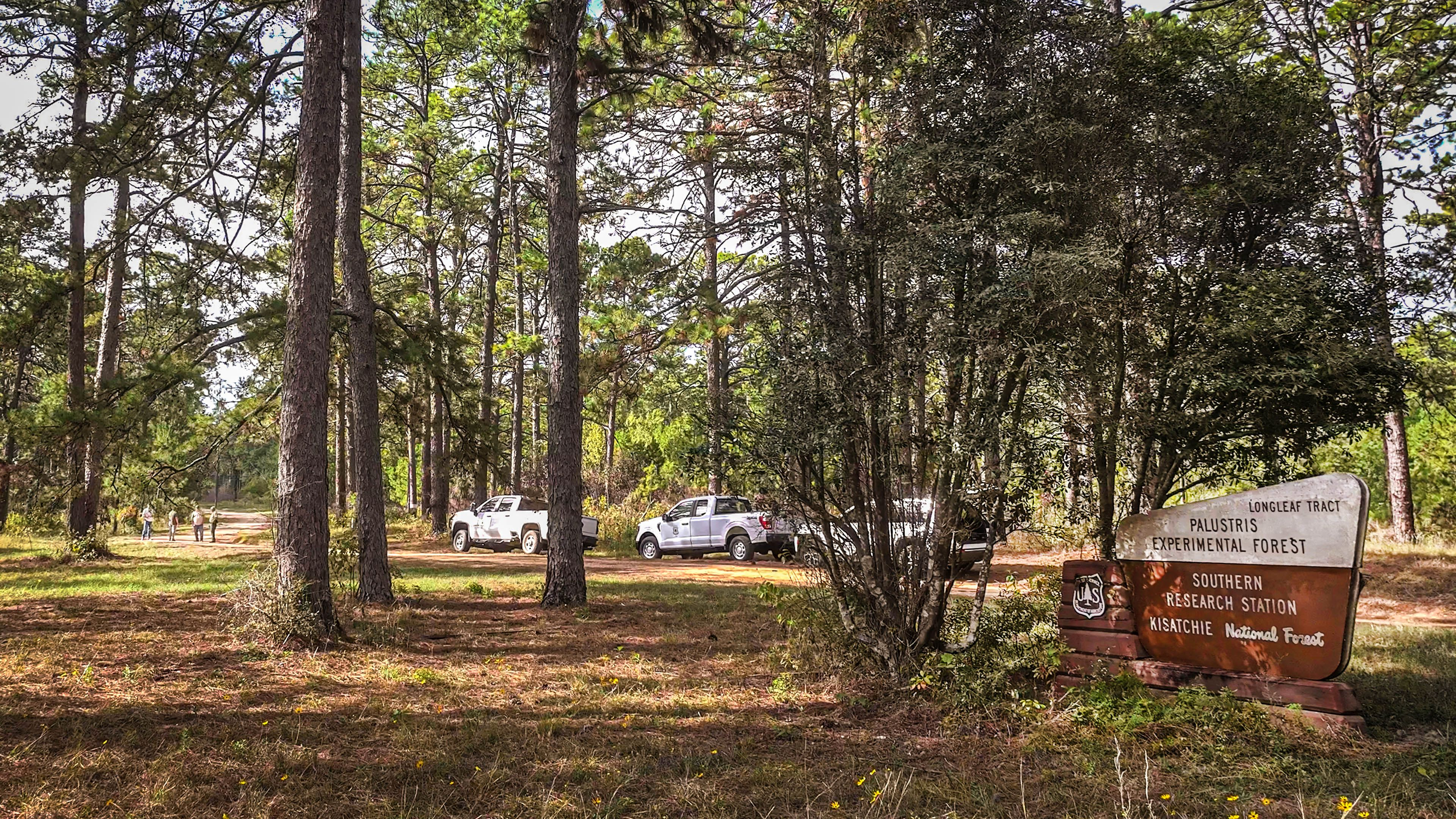
- Longleaf Tract in 2023

- Location within Louisiana Location within the United States
- Location: Rapides Parish, Louisiana, United States
- Nearest city: Alexandria, Louisiana
- Coordinates: 31°11′00″N 92°40′00″W
- Area: 7,500 acres (3,000 ha)
- Established: July 19, 1935
- Governing body: USFS, Southern Research Station

Palustris Experimental Forest is an experimental forest operated by the Southern Research Station (SRS) of the United States Forest Service in Rapides Parish, Louisiana. It is located south of Alexandria, Louisiana within the Kisatchie National Forest. The experimental forest bears the name of the predominant pine species (Pinus palustris) that covered this region before the virgin pine forests were harvested in the early 1900s.

== History ==
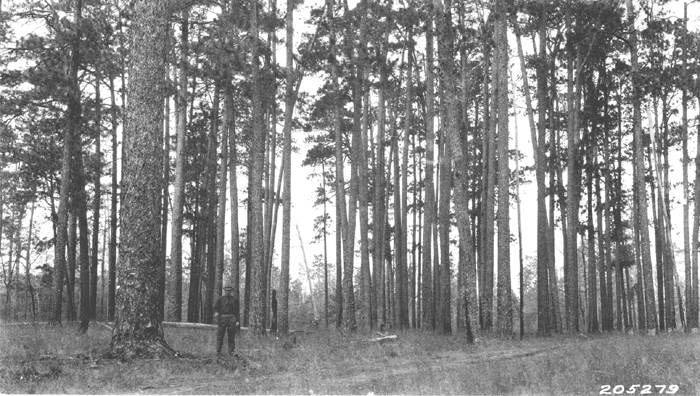
Old-growth longleaf pines, Elizabeth, LA 1925

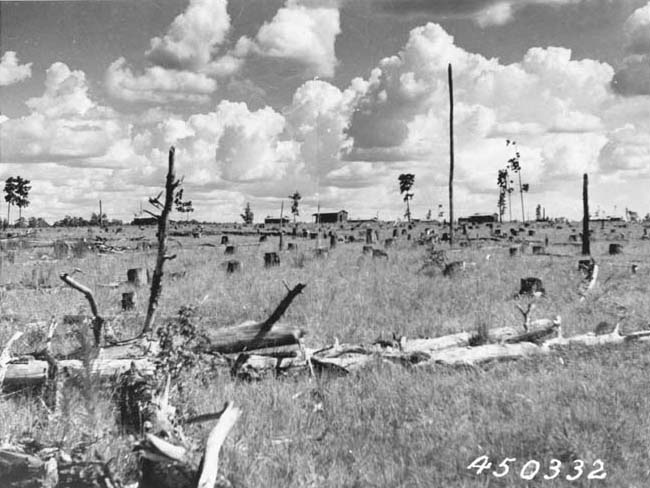
Cutover forestland, Kisatchie National Forest 1947

At the end of the 19th century, the longleaf pine ecosystem covered millions of acres across the southeastern US, from Virginia to Texas. In the early 1900s, aggressive harvesting of these old-growth pine forests resulted in a barren landscape in need of reforestation. Under federal programs such as the Weeks Act and Clarke-McNary Act, the US government began buying thousands of cutover acres in Louisiana and other southeastern states to create National Forests with the goal of rehabilitating these former old-growth forests.

== Palustris Experimental Forest ==
The Palustris Experimental Forest was established July 19, 1935 on 2,700 acres (1,100 ha) of cutover land that was previously occupied by longleaf pine. The experimental forest was to serve as a field laboratory for evaluating pine reforestation techniques.

=== J.K. Johnson Tract ===
In 1950, the original portion of the Palustris Experimental Forest was designated the J.K. Johnson Tract – located at 31.1833°N 92.6667°W – in honor of the Great Southern Lumber Company's chief forester who was an early advocate of reforestation in the South.

Research on the J.K. Johnson Tract has included:

- Collection, processing and storage of pine cones and seeds
- Development of techniques for pine seedling production in nurseries for outplanting of southern pines
- Development of techniques to control brown-spot needle blight (Mycosphaerella dearnessii) in longleaf pine seedlings
- Assess intensive management – prescribed burning, pruning, & thinning – in established pine stands to increase productivity
- Assess global climate change on forest productivity

=== Longleaf Tract ===
In the 1950s, a separate 4,800-acre (1,900 ha) Longleaf Tract – located at 31.0194°N 92.6403°W – was added to the Palustris Experimental Forest to provide research opportunities in large-scale studies:

- Direct seeding of repellant-treated pine seeds to quickly reforest barren landscapes
- Collection of long-term growth data from established longleaf, loblolly (Pinus taeda), and slash (Pinus elliottii) pines for use in growth & yield modeling
- Control of woody-plant competition to improve pine establishment
- Evaluate interactions of cattle grazing, wildlife management, and timber production
- Evaluate effects of forest management practices – timber harvesting, prescribed burning & site preparation – on long-term soil productivity
