= Systematic & Applied Acarology =

- Discipline: Acarology
- Language: English
- Edited by: Zhi-Qiang Zhang

Publication details
- History: 1996-present
- Publisher: Systematic & Applied Acarology Society
- Frequency: Monthly
- Impact factor: 1.732 (2018)

Standard abbreviations
- ISO 4: Syst. Appl. Acarol.

Indexing
- ISSN: 1362-1971
- OCLC no.: 37892820

Links
- Journal homepage; Online access

Systematic & Applied Acarology is a peer-reviewed scientific journal covering research on mites and ticks published trianually by the Systematic & Applied Acarology Society.

In 2012, the society's rapid journal for papers and monographs on mites and ticks, Systematic & Applied Acarology Special Publications, was merged with Systematic and Applied Acarology.

== Abstracting and indexing ==
The journal is abstracted and indexed in Science Citation Index Expanded, Current Contents, BIOSIS Previews, CAB Abstracts, and The Zoological Record.
