= International Journal of Acarology =

- Discipline: Acarology
- Language: English
- Edited by: Ashley Dowling

Publication details
- History: 1975-present
- Publisher: Taylor & Francis
- Frequency: Bimonthly
- Impact factor: 1.236 (2018)

Standard abbreviations
- ISO 4: Int. J. Acarol.

Indexing
- CODEN: IJOADM
- ISSN: 0168-8162 (print); 1572-9702 (web)
- OCLC no.: 03357196

Links
- Journal homepage

The International Journal of Acarology is a peer-reviewed scientific journal of agricultural, aquatic, general, medical, and veterinary acarology. Topics covered include mite and tick behavior, biochemistry, biology, biological pest control, ecology, evolution, morphology, physiology, systematics, and taxonomy. The journal was established in 1975 by Vikram Prasad. It was published by India Publishing House until 2008, when it was acquired by Taylor & Francis.

== Notable contributors ==
- Mercedes Delfinado
