= Peter Koch (wood scientist) =

American wood scientist

- Born: October 15, 1920; Missoula, Montana, US
- Died: February 14, 1998 (aged 77); Missoula, Montana, US
- Education: Montana State University, University of Washington
- Awards: Superior Service Medal of the United States Department of Agriculture in 1968, John Scott Award in 1973
- Scientific career
- Fields: forest products, engineering
- Workplaces: Southern Forest Experiment Station, Intermountain Research Station

Peter Koch (October 15, 1920 – February 14, 1998) was an American engineer and wood scientist who was considered an expert in the field of wood technology by his peers. From 1963 to 1982, Koch led a team of US Forest Service scientists in forest products utilization research specific to forests of the southeastern US. Accomplishments by Koch and his research team included eight US patents plus hundreds of research publications.

== Biography ==
Peter Koch was the youngest of 3 sons born to Elers and Gerda (Heiberg-Jurgensen) Koch in Missoula, Montana. In 1942, he graduated from Montana State College of Agriculture and Engineering at Bozeman with a degree in mechanical engineering. After graduation, Koch enlisted in the United States Army Air Corps as a pilot, mostly flying bombers over the hump into China from 1942 to 1946, attaining the rank of captain.

From 1946 to 1952, Koch worked in Washington (state) at Stetson-Ross Machine Company – a company that designs lumber processing machinery. In 1950, Koch married Doris Ann Hagen. In 1952, he enrolled in graduate school at the University of Washington and received a PhD in wood technology in 1954. Afterwards, Koch taught at Michigan State University (1955–1957) and was vice-president of a hardwood lumber producer – the Champlin Company – in Rochester, New Hampshire (1957–1963).

=== Forest Service research ===
By the 1960s, there was concern by timber industries in the South about the lack of forest product utilization research into the use of smaller trees that had replaced the virgin pine forests. To address that concern, the US Forest Service recruited Peter Koch in 1963 to head a newly formed wood utilization research program at the Southern Forest Experiment Station in Pineville, Louisiana. One of the first staff members enlisted by Koch was Chung-Yun Hse, a young graduate student of Taiwanese descent, to focus on adhesives for gluing southern pine plywood. During his tenure, Koch and his staff of scientists generated the following technological advancements:

- Developed wood adhesives that would bond layers of southern pine plywood.
- Developed laminated wooden beams by gluing laminae (layers of wood) from single species.
- Developed new versions of chipping headrigs, to convert small round logs into square timbers, thereby reducing waste from wood slabs and sawdust.
- Developed a method for reducing the time for drying southern pine 2-by-4 studs while maintaining straightness.
- Developed structural flakeboard from mixed southern pine and hardwood species.
- Developed equipment to sever the lateral roots of trees to extract the main root mass for use as fuel or pulp.
- Developed a prototype of a mobile chipper to gather post-harvest limbs and tops of cut trees, as well as shrubs and stumps for conversion into mulch, fuel, or fiber.

In 1982, Koch returned to Montana and served as chief wood scientist at the Forest Service Intermountain Research Station in Missoula until 1985. In 1985, Koch established his own corporation – Wood Science Laboratory, Inc. – in Corvallis, Montana. In 1996, Koch produced his last publication – a thousand-page tome on lodgepole pine based on more than a decade of research.

=== Death ===
Peter Koch died February 14, 1998, in Missoula, Montana.

== Selected publications ==
- Koch, Peter. 1964. Wood Machining Processes. Ronald Press Company, NY. 530 p. ISBN 0608115290
- Koch, Peter. 1972. Utilization of the Southern Pines – Volumes I (p. 1-734) and II (p. 735-1663). Agricultural Handbook SFES-AH-420. Asheville, NC: USDA-Forest Service, Southern Forest Experiment Station.
- Koch, Peter. 1985. Utilization of Hardwoods Growing on Southern Pine Sites – Volumes I (p. 1-1418), II (p. 1419-2542), and III (p. 2543-3710). Agricultural Handbook SFES-AH-605. Asheville, NC: USDA-Forest Service, Southern Forest Experiment Station.
- Peter Koch. 1996. Lodgepole Pine in North America – Volumes I, II and III. Forest Products Society. Madison, Wisconsin. 1096 p. ISBN 0-935018-78-6.

== Patents ==
- Method for producing studs from cordwood and veneer cores, (1969).
- A process for producing laminated beams, where the entire log or bolt of wood is utilized, regardless of undesirable properties in the lumber, (1971).
- A process for steam straightening and kiln drying lumber, (1972).
- A method for producing parallel laminated pine lumber from veneer, (1975).
- A helical flaking head with multiple cutting circle diameters for milling lumber, (1977).
- A system for burning green bark to produce heat or power in sawmills, (1977).
- A wood pulping apparatus modified to yield paper products of improved properties, (1978).

== Honors and awards ==
- 1968 – Superior Service Medal of the USDA for his contributions in development of chipping headrigs, gluing practices for the manufacture of southern pine plywood, and a system for gluing single-species wooden beams.
- 1973 – John Scott Award for "invention of the chipping headrig".
- 1974 – Designated "Fellow" in the International Academy of Wood Science.
- 1980 – Honorary Doctor of Science, University of Maine.
- 1982 – Designated "Fellow" in the Society of American Foresters.
- 1987 – Society of Wood Science and Technology Distinguished Service Award "...in recognition of distinguished service to the profession as a whole and for extraordinary contributions in wood science and technology".
- Recipient of the Fred W. Gottschalk Memorial Award for outstanding service to the Forest Products Society.
