= Acarology =

Study of mites and ticks

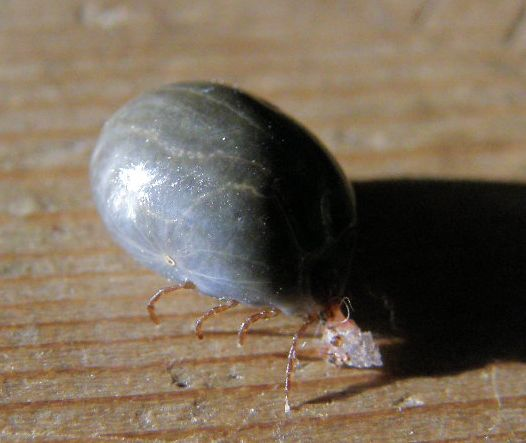
The Acari are identified in acarology as a taxon of arachnids that contains mites and ticks. They are an example of something an acarologist would study.

Acarology (from Ancient Greek ἀκαρί/ἄκαρι, akari, a type of mite; and -λογία, -logia) is the study of mites and ticks, the animals in the order Acarina. It is a subfield of arachnology, a subdiscipline of the field of zoology. A zoologist specializing in acarology is called an acarologist. Acarologists may also be parasitologists because many members of Acarina are parasitic. Many acarologists are studying around the world both professionally and as amateurs. The discipline is a developing science and research has been provided for it in more recent history.

== Acarological organisations ==
- Laboratory of Medical Acarology, Academy of Sciences of the Czech Republic
- Tick Research Laboratory, University of Rhode Island
- Tick Research Lab at Texas A&M University

=== Acarological societies ===
==== International ====
- International Congress of Acarology
- Societe Internationale des Acarologues de Langue Francaise
- Systematic and Applied Acarology Society
- Sociedad Latinoamericana de Acarologia

==== Regional ====
- Acarology Society of America
- Acarological Society of Iran
- Acarological Society of Japan
- African Acarology Association
- Egyptian Society of Acarology
- European Association of Acarologists

== Notable acarologists ==
- Mercedes Delfinado, founded the Instituto Politécnico Nacional's Laboratory of Acrology, recipient of a Guggenheim Fellowship.
- Edward W. Baker (1914–2005), Berlese Acarology Award, described as one of the two " fathers of modern acarology". USDA and Department Entomology, National Museum of Natural History, Smithsonian Institution
- George W. Wharton (25 January 1914- 4 April 1990), professor emeritus of Biological Sciences and Past Director, Acarology Laboratory, The Ohio State University, described as one of the two " fathers of modern acarology", Ohio State University, author "An Introduction to Acarology" with E.W. Baker, and "A Manual of Chiggers"with H.S. Fuller.
- Natalia Aleksandrovna Filippova, the ixodid tick Dermacentor filippovae Apanaskevich & Apanaskevich was named after her.
- Harry Hoogstraal, was described as "the greatest authority on ticks and tickborne diseases who ever lived." The American Society of Tropical Medicine and Hygiene's Harry Hoogstraal Medal for Outstanding Achievement in Medical Entomology honors his contributions to science. He has more than 20 species named after him
- Robert Lee Smiley (1929–2010) USDA and Department Entomology, National Museum of Natural History, Smithsonian Institution, recognized by his work on parasitic and predatory of the mite families Cheyletidae and Cunaxidae.
- Pat Nuttall, professor of Arbo virology in the Department of Zoology of the University of Oxford.
- Maria V. Pospelova-Shtrom, discovered the Ryukyu Rabbit Tick
- Ronald Vernon Southcott, self-published a book 'Studies on incidences and correlations of diseases and immunizations in South Australian schoolchildren 1952–1962.
- Jane Brotherton Walker (31 January 1925 – 3 April 2009), in the field of tick taxonomy, particularly in Africa.
- Aleksei Zachvatkin, discovered hypermetamorphosis in the Meloidae and Bombyliidae, A number of mite genera are named in his honour including Zachvatkinia Dubinin, 1949 and Zachvatkinella Lange, 1954.
- Anita Hoffmann, founded the Instituto Politécnico Nacional's Laboratory of Acrology
- Maria Tonelli-Rondelli, studiedthe taxonomy and identification of ticks (Ixodidae), especially South American species
- James Allen McMurtry (1932–2017), professor emeritus and Entomologist at the University of California Riverside. World specialist on predatory mites.
- John. C Moser (1929–2015), United States Forest Service entomologist and acarologist, pioneering research on mites associated with red imported fire ants.
- Cecil Warburton, specialized in ticks of medical and veterinary importance.
- Roy A. Norton, professor emeritus State University of New York-College of Environmental Science and Forestry in Syracuse, New York
- Barry OConnor, Professor Emeritus at the University of Michigan, Ann Arbor, Michigan.
- Ronald Ochoa, USDA- REE, research scientist at the Systematic Entomology Laboratory and curator of the National Mite Collection at the Smithsonian Institution.

== Journals ==
The leading scientific journals for acarology include:

- Acarologia
- Acarines
- Experimental and Applied Acarology
- International Journal of Acarology
- Systematic & Applied Acarology
- Ticks and Tick-borne Diseases
- Persian Journal of Acarology

== See also ==
- Parasitology
- List of words ending in ology
