= Beklemishev family =

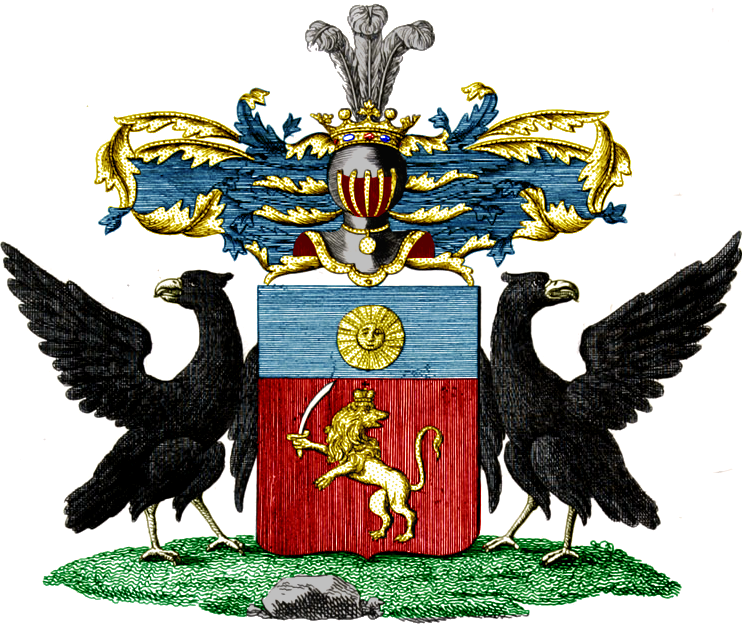
Coat of arms of Beklemishev noble family

The Beklemishev family is an old Russian family of Armenian origin (means "guard"), which was also part of the Russian nobility.

== Notable members ==
- Vladimir Beklemishev (disambiguation), a name of several Russian people
- Yury Krymov, a pen name of Yuriy Beklemishev
- Lev Beklemishev, a mathematician affiliated with University of Amsterdam and the Steklov Mathematical Institute of the Russian Academy of Sciences in Moscow
