= Anita Hoffmann =

Mexican parasitologist and acarologist

Ana Esther Hoffmann Mendizábal
- Born: 3 March 1919; Puebla, Mexico
- Died: 11 October 2007 (aged 88); Cuernavaca, Mexico
- Other name: Anita Hoffmann
- Education: National Autonomous University of Mexico
- Scientific career
- Fields: acarology; parasitology
- Workplaces: Institute of Public Health and Tropical Diseases of Mexico; National Autonomous University of Mexico

Ana Esther Hoffmann Mendizábal (3 March 1919 – 11 October 2007), also known as Anita Hoffmann, was a Mexican researcher, educator, academic, and biologist specializing in acarology and parasitology. She was a pioneer in the study of arachnids and acari in Mexico. She founded the Instituto Politécnico Nacional's Laboratory of Acrology in 1965, the first in Latin America, and another at the Faculty of Sciences of the National Autonomous University of Mexico in 1977.

== Education and personal life ==
On 3 March 1919, Ana Esther Hoffmann Mendizábal was born in Puebla, a state of Mexico. Her father was Carlos Cristian Hoffmann, a German-Mexican entomologist, and she accompanied him on fieldwork to other states in Mexico to meet and work with other scientists like Francisco Villagrán, Isaac Ochoterena, Leopoldo Ancona, José de Lille, Helia Bravo Hollis, and Rafael Martín del Campo. Hoffmann would later be taught by some of these men during her university.

In 1939, Hoffmann was among the first classes of students to enroll at the National Autonomous University of Mexico's School of Sciences following its founding in July of that year. She was awarded her master's degree from UNAM in 1941. She undertook advanced training in the USA about ticks and mites at Duke University and with the mite collection at the Smithsonian Museum. She was awarded a D. Sc degree for work on Trombiculidae mites by UNAM in 1965.

== Career ==
After graduating her first post was in the Institute of Biology and she became a research assistant. In 1944, she moved to the Institute of Public Health and Tropical Diseases of Mexico to work on ticks and their infection with Rocky Mountain spotted fever group Rickettsia bacteria. In 1965 she founded and became head of the first laboratory of acarology in Latin America. She also began to teach acarology. In 1975 she was appointed as a professor at UNAM and led a second laboratory for acarology.

As well as ticks and mites, Hoffmann also worked on the classification and description of other ectoparasites of mammals, their host-parasite relationships. She also collaborated in research about scabies.

== Publications ==
Hoffmann was the author or co-author of over 130 articles and 10 books.These include:

- Animales desconocidos: relatos acarológicos (Unknown animals: acarological tales) (1988)
- Biodiversidad de ácaros en México (Biodiversity of mites in Mexico) (2000)

She described around 60 taxa of mites. Examples include Chapalania cifuentesi within the family Laelapidae and a new eriophyid mite Acalitus santibanezi.

== Awards and honours ==
In 1974 Hoffmann was given honorary membership of the Veterinary Parasitology Society and in 1982 became an honorary member of the Mexican Zoology Society and of the Biological Sciences Academy Society of the Universidad Autónoma de Nayarit the Mexican Zoology Society in 1983 and the Mexican Parasitology Society in 1987. In 1995 the Mexican Entomology Society (1995) made her an honorary member.

Hoffmann was recognized as an emeritus researcher of the National Researchers System in 1984. In 1990 she received the National University Award, followed by the Diploma of Academic Merit from the Colegio de Biólogos de México (Mexican Board of Biologists) in 1997 along with the title of Distinguished Researcher of the National Polytechnic Institute (IPN) and the Medal of College Merit. She was made an Emeritus Professor of UNAM in 2001.

Around 40 species have been named after her.

== Legacy ==
Her collection of 100,000 mites and 400 spiders, as well as millipedes, centipedes and other ectoparasites is held in the Institute of Biology of UNAM.
