= John C. Moser =

American entomologist

John Conrad Moser (1929 near Columbus, Ohio, United States; – August 26, 2015 in Pineville, Louisiana, United States) was an American zoologist, forestry researcher, entomologist, and acarologist.

== Education ==
Moser graduated from high school in 1947 and finally studied at the Ohio State University (OSU), where he soon recognized his interest in entomology. His undergraduate professor was Ralph Davidson, who supported and motivated Moser to perform studies on galls on leaves of a hackberry tree (Celtis occidentalis), which was growing in Moser's front yard, where he at once detected a new wasp species of the genus Torymus. This finding inspired his further research. He was cited with: "I had observed something that no one else in the world had ever seen" (Moser 2000).

Before Moser received his B.S. in entomology in 1951, he was assisting the OSU Professor C.H. Kennedy, from which he learned the most important basics of ant systematics and behavior. Moser completed his master's degree at the OSU in biological control under Professor Alvah Peterson.

== Career ==
After 1951, when the Korean War reached its apex, Moser became assigned to the Army Chemical Center at Edgewood Arsenal near Baltimore, where he served as a technician at the Army Medical Corps, Insect Physiology Laboratory. One of his mentors was Bertram Sacktor, one of the leading insect biochemists at those times. With him and other colleagues, Moser got his first scientific publication as a junior author:"Dephosphorylation of ATP by tissues of the American cockroach". Before Moser was released from the Army in 1953, he described his new species of Torymus together with other new parasitoids from his hackberry galls in Columbus. His mentor for this work was Barnard D. Burks, who encouraged him for his further scientific career.

After he had finished his Ph.D. in 1958, he was informed by Jack Coyne about the possibility to apply for a GS-4 position in the Station's Timber Management Research unit at Alexandria, LA. Moser arrived on July 1, 1958 as the first Ph.D. entomologist, hired by the Southern Forest Experiment Station.

He conducted research on the Texas leafcutter ant and the red imported fire ant and focused his studies not only on these ants, but specifically also to the mite fauna, being associated with these insects. Also bark beetles and associated mites were a remarkable part of his pioneering research contributions. His extensive mite collection contains many species of different major mite-taxa from around the world, with most of them representing phoretic species, which use insects to be carried to their new habitats. Moser described numerous new mite species and some species are also named after him.

In Alexandria, Moser began to perform studies on the town ant Atta texana, a significant pest on pine seedlings during reforestation. His supervisor was Wiliam F. Mann, who was searching for a short-term effort to control the ant colonies. This caused a conflict between his destination and the scientific persuasion of Moser, who thought that only long-term studies to understand the ant's biology would enable a successful control of this ant species. Despite these conflicts with his supervisor, Moser could continue with his research access. While doing so, he collaborated with numerous elite scientists. One of them was Edward O. Wilson, the famous ant biologist, who won two Pulitzer Prizes.

Since 1962, Moser was additionally involved in research projects about mites associated with bark beetles, at its beginning under the leadership of William H. Bennett.

== Retirement ==
Moser retired on December 31, 1989, but immediately signed on as a volunteer with the Forest Service. He continued almost until his death in 2015 with research projects. He for example was involved in the excavation and mapping of a town ant colony or studied interrelationships among bark beetles, mites, fungi and nematodes and continued with international collaborations on species identification.

== Selected publications ==
- M. Pernek, S. Wirth, S. R. Blomquist, D. N. Avtzis, J. C. Moser: New associations of phoretic mites on Pityokteines curvidens (Coleoptera, Curculionidae, Scolytinae). Central European Journal of Biology. Volume 7, Issue 1, 2012: S. 63-68.
- J. C. Moser, H. Konrad, S. R. Blomquist, T. Kirisits: Do mites phoretic on elm bark beetles contribute to the transmission of Dutch elm disease?, Naturwissenschaften 97: 219, 2010: doi:10.1007/s00114-009-0630-x.
- J. C. Moser: Complete Excavation and Mapping of a Texas Leafcutting Ant Nest. Annals of the Entomological Society of America 99(Sep 2006) January 2009:891-897.
- Y. J. Cardoza, J. C. Moser, K. D. Klepzig, K. F. Raffa: Multipartite Symbioses Among Fungi, Mites, Nematodes, and the Spruce Beetle, Dendroctonus rufipennis</I. Environmental Entomology, 2008: 37(4):956-63.
- J. C. Moser, J. D. Reeve, J. M. S. Bento, [...], N. M. Heck: Eye size and behavior of day- and night-flying leafcutting ant alates, Journal of Zoology 264(1), 2006:69 - 75.
