= Mercedes Delfinado =

Filipino-American acarologist

- Born: 16 January 1933 (age 93); Cabuyao, Laguna, Philippine Islands
- Citizenship: (United States) American
- Education: Cornell University; University of Hawaiʻi
- Known for: The study of bee mites
- Spouse: Edward W. Baker
- Awards: Guggenheim Fellowship

Mercedes D. Delfinado (born 16 January 1933) is a Filipino acarologist. She is a specialist in bee mites, and published widely on insects of south-east Asia. For over twenty years, she was a Chief Editor for the International Journal of Acarology. Multiple species were named in her honour. In 1962, Delfinado was a recipient of a Guggenheim Fellowship.

== Biography ==
Delfinado was born in Cabuyao, Laguna on 16 January 1933. She graduated with a Master of Science degree in entomology from Cornell University in 1960. She was awarded a Guggenheim Fellowship in 1962 for her work on organisimic biology and ecology. In 1966, she graduated from the University of Hawaiʻi with a PhD in acarology. While there, she co-prepared a catalogue of Philippine Diptera. She married Edward W. Baker, also an acarologist, with whom she worked at the United States Department of Agriculture's (USDA) Systematic Entomology Laboratory in Beltsville, building the collection there, and in 1999 expanding the premises to accommodate more researchers.

While at the USDA, Delfinado specialised in the study of bees at the Beneficial Insects Laboratory. This included the identification of the honey bee mite Acarapsis woodi and she was the first to report the presence of Melittiphis alvearius in the United States. Heavily involved with the International Journal of Acarology, she was a Chief Editor for over twenty years until her retirement in 1999. She and her husband retired to the Philippines, and she established a research fellowship on mite taxonomy in his honour.

== Eponymous species ==
- Ker mercedesae
- Culex (Lophoceraomyia) uniformis ssp. mercedesae
- Culicoides delfinadoae
- Tipula (Sinotipula) delfinadoae
- Tarsonemus mercedesae

== Selected publications ==
- Smiley, Robert L., W. Baker Edward, and Mercedes Delfinado Baker. "New species of Hypoaspis (Acari: Mesostigmata: Laelapidae) from the nest of a stingless bee in Malaysia (Hymenoptera: Meliponinae, Apidae)." Anales del Instituto de Biología serie Zoología 67.002 (1996).
- Delfinado-Baker, Mercedes, and Christine YS Peng. "Varroa jacobsoni and Tropilaelaps clareae: A perspective of life history and why Asian bee-mites preferred European honey bees." American bee journal (USA) (1995).
- Delfinado, Mercedes D., and Edward W. Baker. "Varroidae, a new family of mites on honey bees (Mesostigmata: Acarina)." Journal of the Washington Academy of Sciences (1974): 4–10.
- Delfinado, Mercedes O. "New species of shore flies from Hong Kong and Taiwan (Diptera: Canaceidae)." Oriental Insects 5.1 (1971): 117–123.
- Mercedes D. Delfinado, Notes on Philippine Black Flies (Diptera : Simuliidae), Journal of Medical Entomology, Volume 6, Issue 2, 1 May 1969, Pages 199–207
- Delfinado, Mercedes D. "Mites of the honeybee in South-East Asia." Journal of Apicultural Research 2.2 (1963): 113–114.
