= Chung-Yun Hse =

Taiwanese American wood scientist (1935–2021)

- Born: February 19, 1935
- Died: November 12, 2021 (aged 86); Austin, Texas, U.S.
- Education: Louisiana State University (MS); University of Washington (PhD)
- Known for: "Application of resin and composite technology to advance the use of wood fiber resources into high performance composite products"
- Spouse: Suh H Hse
- Children: 3
- Scientific career
- Institutions: USDA Forest Service, Southern Research Station

Chung-Yun Hse (February 19, 1935 – November 12, 2021) was a Taiwanese American research scientist in wood utilization, who was an elected fellow (FIAWS) of the International Academy of Wood Science. He served at the USDA Forest Service Southern Research Station in Pineville, Louisiana from 1967 through 2019.

== Education and research career ==
Originally from Taiwan, Chung-Yun Hse obtained a master's degree in forest soil chemistry from Louisiana State University. In 1972, he received a PhD in wood science and technology from the University of Washington.

In 1963, a new research program was initiated at the Southern Forest Experiment Station in Pineville, Louisiana to address the lack of forest product utilization research in the Southern United States. A key component of that research was development of wood adhesives to bind resinous wood from southern pines for plywood production, and Hse was selected to address that area of research.

During his 50-year career with the US Forest Service, Hse produced three US patents, authored or coauthored more than 150 research publications, and hosted more than 40 scientists from research institutes and universities around the world. He retired in January 2020 as emeritus scientist.

== Awards ==
Awards from USDA Forest Service:

- 1992 – Award for Technology Transfer from Station Director
- 2001 – Award for International Programs from Station Director
- 2003 – Award for Sustained Excellence in Science from Station Director
- 2004 – Honor Award for Distinguished Science from Forest Service Chief

National and international recognition:

- 1994 – Award for Excellence in International Forestry Cooperation and Exchange from Chinese Ministry of Forestry
- 1998 – Fellow of the International Academy of Wood Science
- 2001 – China's Friendship Award in appreciation of enthusiastic support for China's construction and friendly cooperation
- 2008 – Fred W. Gottschalk Memorial Award for outstanding service to the Forest Products Society
- 2012 – Distinguished Service Award Society of Wood Science and Technology
- 2013 – The International Scientific and Technological Cooperation Award of The People's Republic of China

== Patents ==
- Method of bonding particle board and the like using polyisocyanate/phenolic adhesive (1980).
- Process for detoxification of CCA-treated wood (2007).
- Process for rapid microwave-enhanced detoxification of CCA-treated wood (2011).

== Death ==
Chung-Yun Hse died November 12, 2021, in Austin, Texas.
