= Bertram Sacktor =

Bertram Sacktor was an American renal biochemist and gerontologist.

== Biography ==
Sacktor received his Ph.D. from Rutgers University.

From 1967 until 1988, Sacktor was the chief of the Biological Chemistry Laboratory at the Gerontology Research Center of the National Institute on Aging in Baltimore.

Sacktor previously held positions as the chief of the Laboratory of Molecular Aging at the National Institute of Child Health and Human Development and as chief biochemist and director of medical research at Edgewater Arsenal in Maryland. He also held faculty positions at Johns Hopkins University and the University of Maryland.
