= Ticks and Tick-Borne Diseases =

- Subject: Infectious diseases
- Language: English
- Edited by: Ben Mans, Ard Menzo Nijhof

Publication details
- History: 2010-present
- Publisher: Elsevier
- Frequency: Bimonthly
- Open access: Yes
- License: CC BY
- Impact factor: 3.2 (2022)

Standard abbreviations
- ISO 4: Ticks Tick-Borne Dis.

Indexing
- ISSN: 1877-959X (print); 1877-9603 (web)
- OCLC no.: 558876121

Links
- Journal homepage; Online archive

Ticks and Tick-Borne Diseases is a bimonthly peer-reviewed medical journal published by Elsevier. It covers research on ticks and tick-borne infectious diseases. The editors-in-chief are Ben Mans, Ard Menzo Nijhof. According to the Journal Citation Reports, the journal has a 2022 impact factor of 3.2.
