= Research Natural Area =

Protected areas managed by various US government agencies

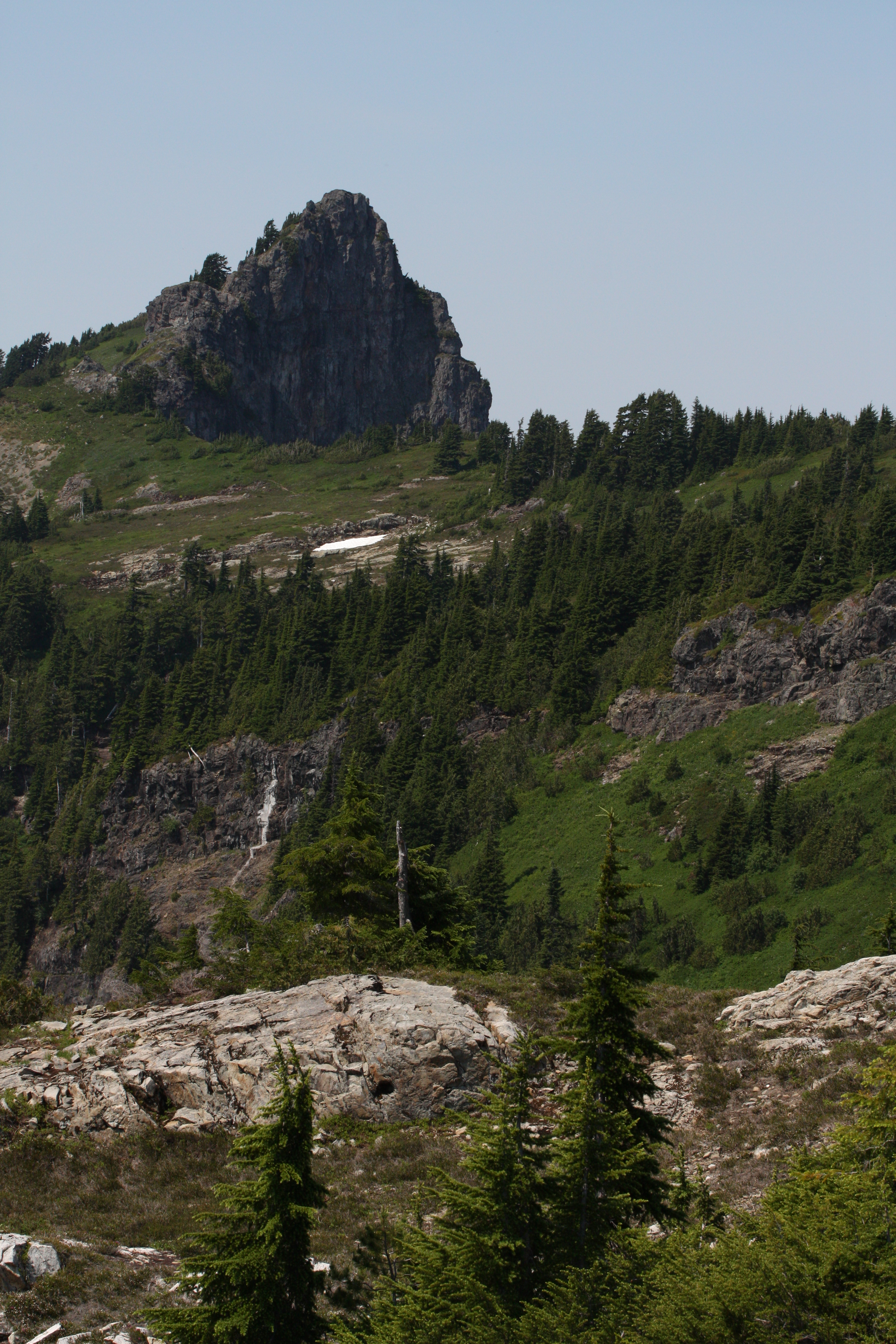
Perry Creek Research Natural Area in Washington

Research Natural Area is a designation for certain protected areas in the United States.

Research Natural Areas (RNAs) are part of a nationwide network of ecological areas set aside for both research and education. The network includes areas managed by many Federal agencies. The United States Forest Service and other agencies establish these areas to typify certain types of important forest, shrubland, grassland, aquatic, geological, alpine, or similar environments that have unique characteristics of scientific interest. The areas "contain important ecological and scientific values and are managed for minimum human disturbance". The first RNA was established on the Coronado National Forest in Arizona in 1927.

The Bureau of Land Management is another agency that designates and manages Research Natural Areas. According to the Bureau of Land Management, the objectives of the RNA program are "(1) To preserve examples of all significant natural ecosystems for comparison with those influenced by man; (2) to provide educational and research areas for ecological and environmental studies; and (3) to preserve gene pools of typical and endangered plants and animals. Research natural areas are intended to represent the full array of North American ecosystems with their biological communities, habitats, natural phenomena, and geological and hydrological formations." The Bureau of Land Management manages 192 RNAs with a total area of 502,748 acres (2,034.55 km^{2}).

As of 1993, the US Forest Service managed 289 established RNAs and more than 300 candidate RNAs. As of 2018, there were 571 US Forest Service RNAs (Note that these are not complete lists):

Forest Service Region	Number of RNAs	Reference
1, Northern	106	https://www.fs.fed.us/rmrs/rna-listings
2, Rocky Mountain	35	https://www.fs.fed.us/rmrs/rna-listings
3, Southwestern	18	https://www.fs.fed.us/rmrs/rna-listings
4, Intermountain	115	https://www.fs.fed.us/rmrs/rna-listings
5, Pacific Southwest	98	https://www.fs.fed.us/psw/rna/description.shtml#list
6, Pacific Northwest	87	https://www.fsl.orst.edu/rna/org_list.html
8, Southern	33	
9, Eastern and Northeastern	64	https://www.nrs.fs.fed.us/rna/established/
10, Alaska	15	, , p. J-3.

These areas are established under the Organic Act of 1897. Areas designated as Research Natural Areas are primarily located inside National Forests.
