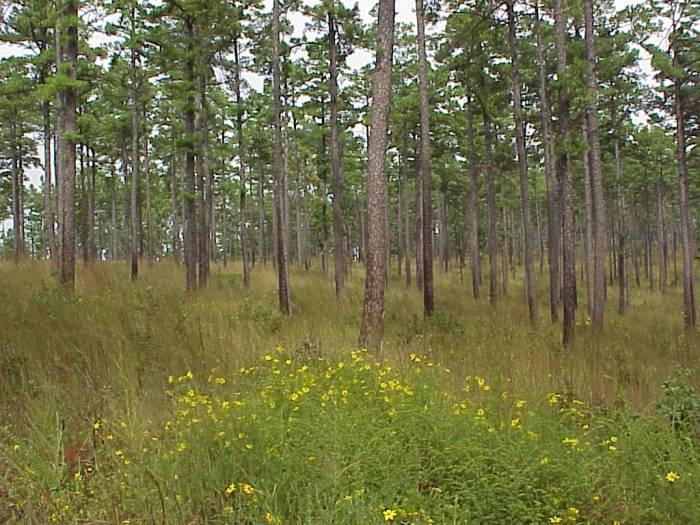
- Shortleaf pine savanna

Conservation status
- Least Concern (IUCN 3.1)

Scientific classification
- Kingdom: Plantae
- Clade: Tracheophytes
- Clade: Gymnosperms
- Division: Pinophyta
- Class: Pinopsida
- Order: Pinales
- Family: Pinaceae
- Genus: Pinus
- Subgenus: P. subg. Pinus
- Section: P. sect. Trifoliae
- Subsection: P. subsect. Australes
- Species: P. echinata

Binomial name
- Pinus echinata Mill.
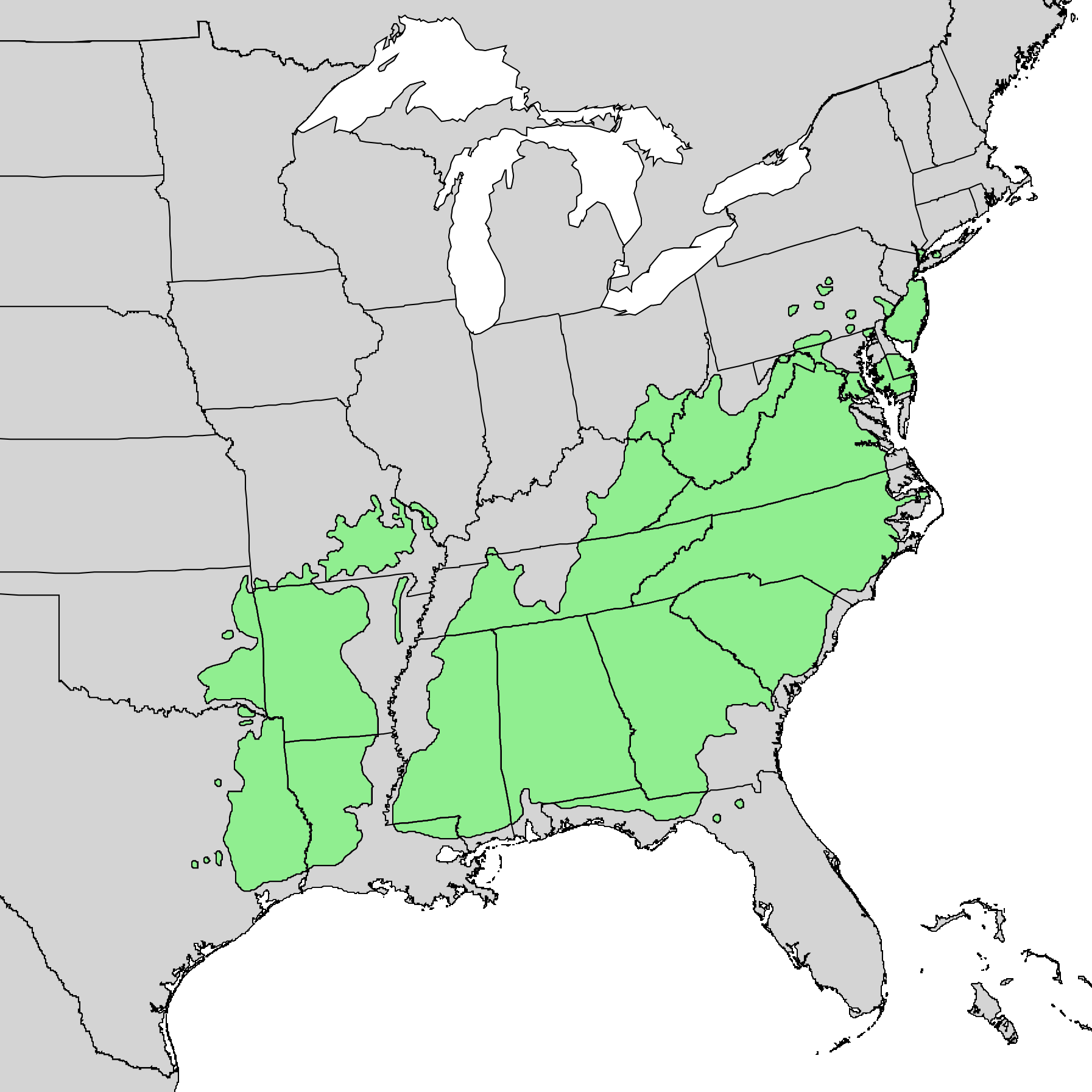
- Natural range

= Pinus echinata =

Shortleaf pine

Species of conifer

The shortleaf pine or Pinus echinata is a species of coniferous tree in the family Pinaceae, a pine endemic to the United States. The shortleaf pine is sometimes referred to as the "old field", "spruce", "rosemary", "yellow", "two-leaf" and "heart" pine. The common name "shortleaf pine" may refer to other species like loblolly pine (Pinus taeda), based on a custom in the Southeastern United States to only refer to pines as either "long-leaf" or "short-leaf". However, P. echinata can be distinguished from other pines by examining its short leaves and small cones.

== Description ==
The tree is variable in form, sometimes straight, sometimes crooked, with an irregular crown. The tree reaches heights of 80–100 feet (24–30 m). In areas that have optimal growing conditions, the height reached is between 100–120 feet (30–37 m). The trunk diameter ranges between 1.5–3 feet (0.46–0.91 m) and averages between 2–3 feet (0.61–0.91 m).

The leaves are needle-like, in fascicles (bundles) of two and three mixed together, and from 7–11 centimetres (2 3/4–4 1/4 inches) long. The cones are 4–7 cm (1 1/2–2 3/4 in) long, with thin scales with a transverse keel and a short prickle. They open at maturity but are persistent. Shortleaf pine seedlings develop a persistent J-shaped crook near the ground surface. Axillary and other buds form near the crook and initiate growth if the upper stem is killed by fire or is severed.

The bark has resin pockets (sometimes called pitch patches), which form small depressions, less than 1 millimetre (1/32 in) in diameter. This feature can be used to distinguish P. echinata from all other Pinus species within its native range. For example, the bark of a loblolly tree is slightly darker, thicker, and more furrowed and rigged in comparison to the shortleaf pine at the beginning of its lifespan, but when it starts maturing these differences fade; however, the resin pockets are still visible on shortleaf pine and can be used for identification.

The crown is a pyramidal head that contains several small branches. It does not change much throughout the tree's lifetime.

The tree has very strong roots, and thus it is able to withstand high winds; additionally, the tree can survive in very dry conditions. The roots are able to reach great depths to search for water. It is believed the roots are this long due to the wide range of the species that consequently experiences varying climate.

Shortleaf pine can be found in a variety of soils including, stiff clay, gravel, and sand. Although the species is not soil-specific, they do not thrive in wet or very poorly drained conditions.

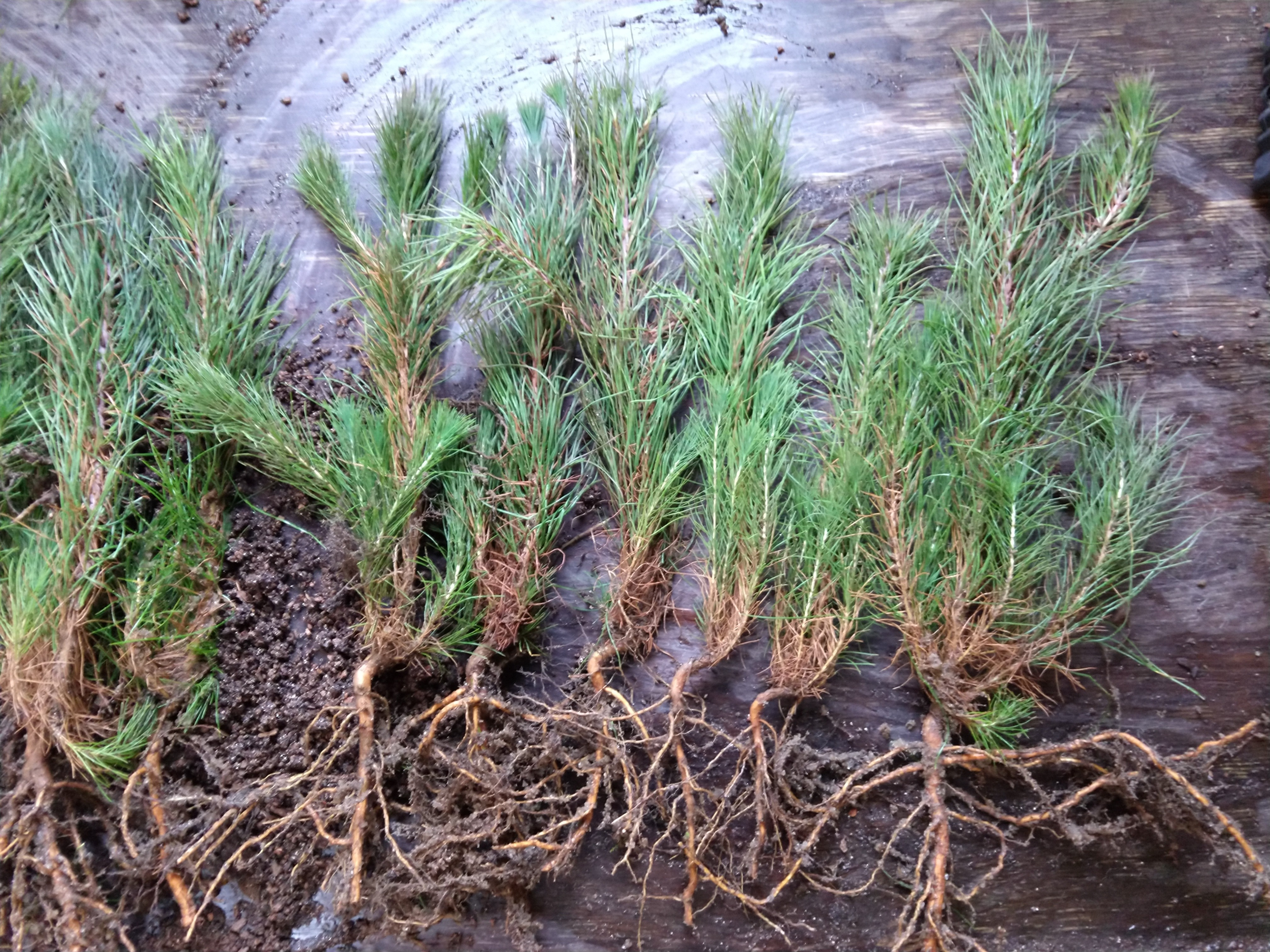
Seedlings for planting, showing J-shaped crooks near base of foliage

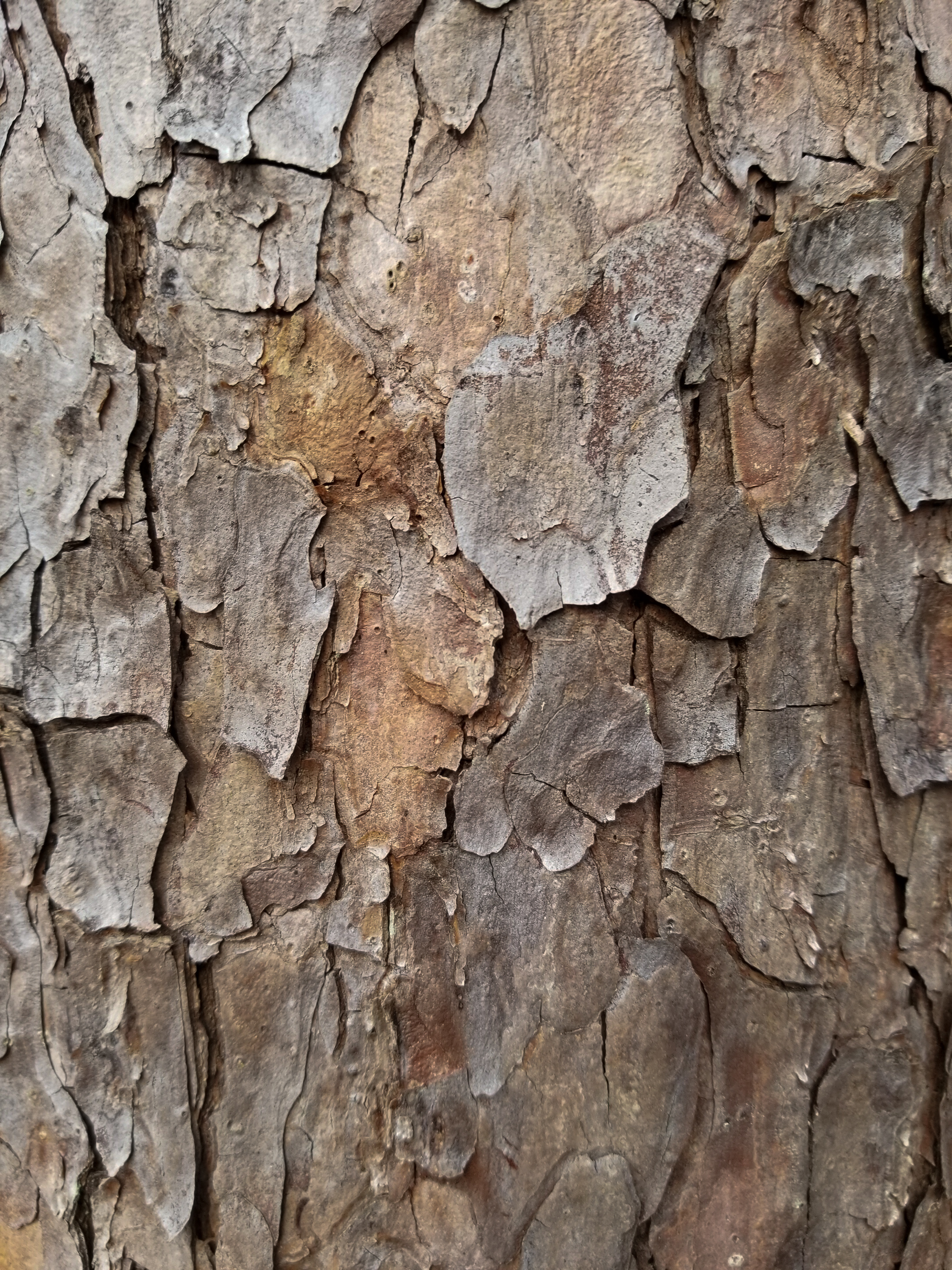
Bark with resin pockets visible

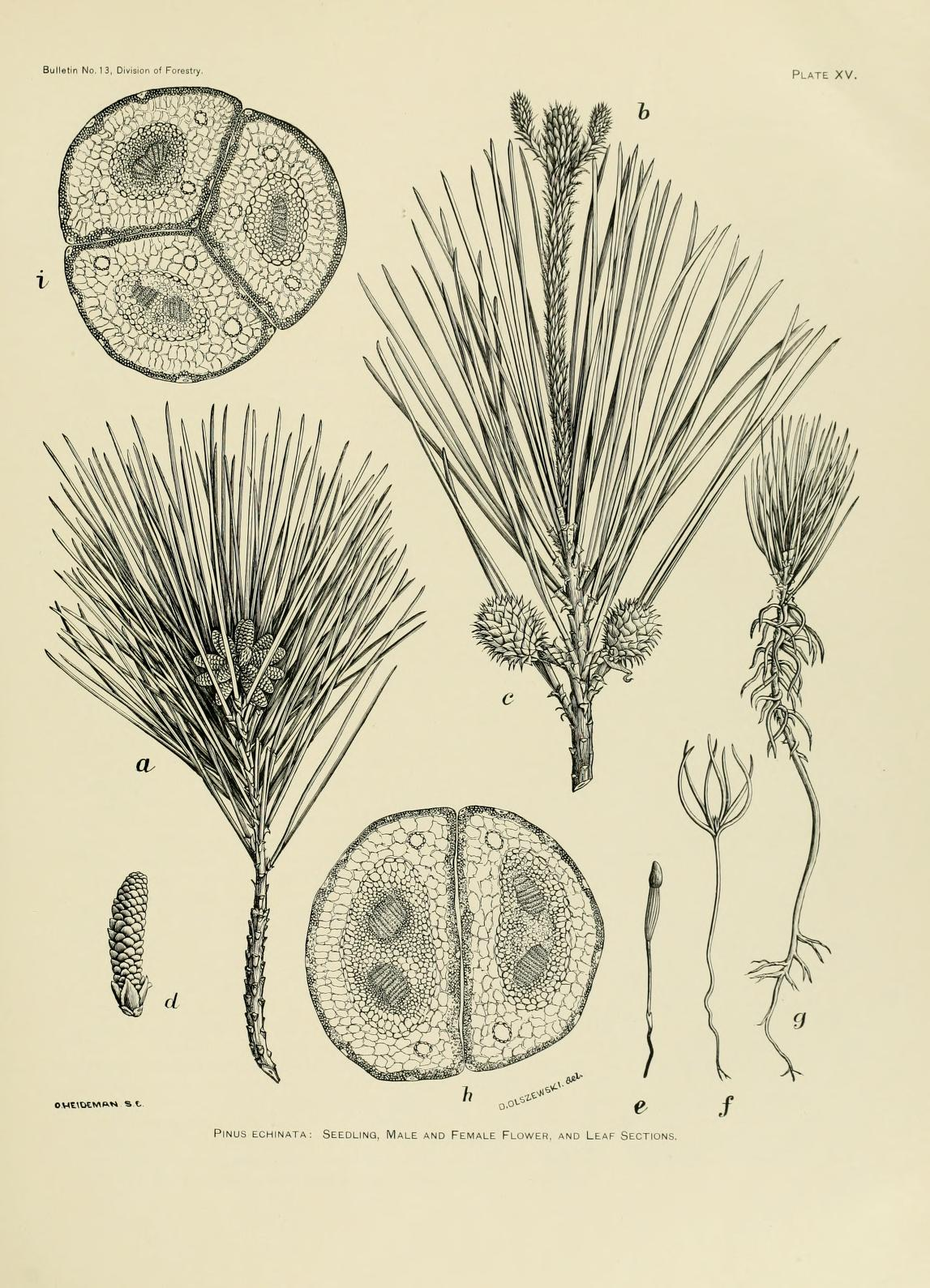
Illustration of tree characteristics

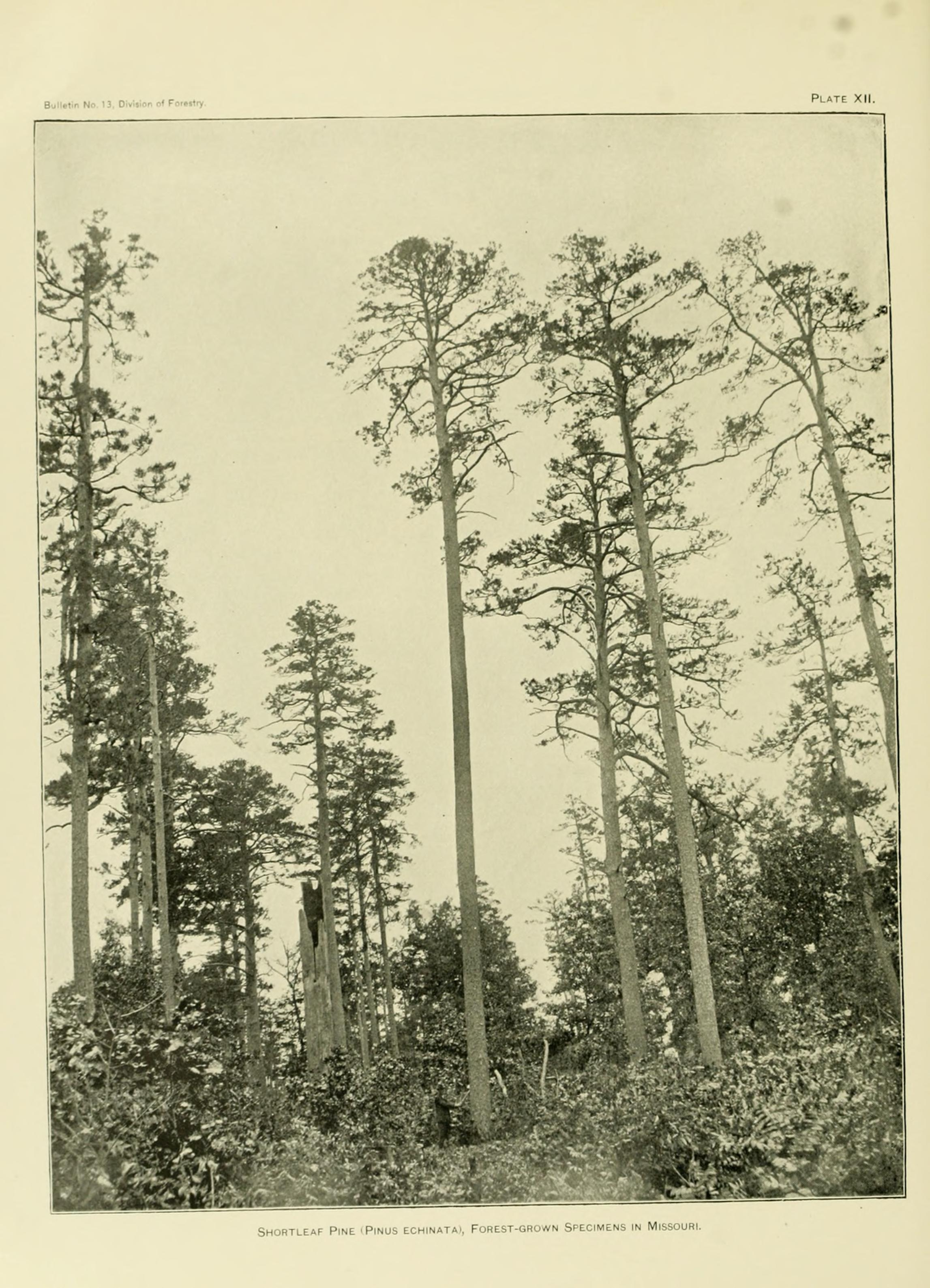
Gigantic specimens, with human for scale

== Taxonomy ==
The shortleaf pine is in the Pinus subgenus. The epithet of echinata means "spiny" and refers to "hedgehog", from echinus. It naturally hybridizes with Pinus taeda; the hybrid typically has a closer resemblance to P. echinata. It was named by Phillip Miller, and the date of publication was April 16, 1768.

== Distribution and habitat ==
Shortleaf pine has the largest range of the southern US yellow pines. It is found from southernmost New York, south to northern Florida, west to eastern Texas and Oklahoma. This pine occupies a variety of habitats from rocky uplands to wet flood plains.

Since the shortleaf pine has such a large range, it can use many different soils. Most shortleaf pines grow in soils that have low organic matter in subsurface horizons and are relatively moist. The shortleaf pine grows in altitudes of up to 3,000 feet in the Southern Appalachians.

There are 85 different forest types that the shortleaf pine is a component, spanning 22 states in the U.S. Generally speaking, the volume of shortleaf pines has decreased over time across the U.S.

== Ecology ==
The shortleaf pine occurs in various habitats such as hardwood forests and open woodlands. The soils, geology, hydrology, and interaction with fire all influence the community structure of the species. It is able to grow in several different hydrological gradients, including sand hills, sandstone hills, and slopes. It occurs in rolling uplands and mesic lowlands. It also occurs in several different forest types; these forest types depend on the classification scheme. According to the Society of American Foresters, the shortleaf pine is found in eighteen different forest cover types and sixty NatureServe plant communities.

Fire plays a key role in shortleaf pines ecology, fire influences their maintenance, structure, composition, regeneration, and establishment. Fire reduces competition with different tree species which increases shortleaf pine survival, and it also prepares the soil for regeneration. Shortleaf pine typically respond well to prescribed fire. With frequent fire, the species can occur in savanna environments, with a very diverse understory and prime habitat for the red-cockaded woodpecker.

The tree frequently hybridizes naturally with loblolly pine and pitch pine where their ranges intersect. Hybridization with loblolly pine has become increasingly frequent in recent decades and results in hybrids with lower fire tolerance.

== Uses ==
Shortleaf pine is a source of wood pulp, plywood veneer, and lumber for a variety of uses. The shortleaf pine is one of the southern US "southern yellow pines"; it is also occasionally called southern yellow pine or the shortstraw pine. The wood from the shortleaf pine is used commercially for creating flooring and beams. In the past, it was used in building ship masts, and during the Revolutionary War and into the 1800s, it was a major timber source for homes. The shortleaf pine is famous for lightwood, also known as fat wood: a resinous wood that is well known for lighting fires. A strong fire with this wood only requires a kitchen match.

The turpentine that is found in the resin of the tree can be used for treatment of the kidney and bladder. It can be used for treating rheumatic infections as a rub or steam bath; it can also be used internally. It has proven useful for treating respiratory illnesses, such as influenza, coughs, colds, and TB. It can also be used dermally for burns, sores, wounds, and boils.

== Conservation ==
There has been a 53% decline of the shortleaf pine since 1980 due to a lack of disturbance required for regeneration of the species, and impacts of farming and extensive logging. Fire exclusion, land conversion, and land development have negative impacts on shortleaf pine.

The Shortleaf Pine Initiative (SPI) was launched in the spring of 2013 to help combat this issue. SPI is composed of state and federal agencies, as well as public and private organizations. There was a range-wide conservation plan released in June 2016 that aimed to increase coordination with shortleaf proponents and maximize current conservation strategies to optimize restoration strategies. This plan has a primary focus on restoring woodlands that were either dominated or co-dominated by shortleaf pines in the past. It is intended to be utilized by natural resource managers, wildlife and conservation biologists, and foresters, as well as policymakers and landowners.

According to NatureServe, the Pinus echinata conservation status is "critically imperiled" in New York, Pennsylvania, and Illinois. Conversely, it is "secure" in North Carolina and Virginia.

== Genetics ==
The shortleaf pine is a diploid organism that has twelve pairs of chromosomes. The genome of the shortleaf is comparatively similar to that of other pine species. The C value of the shortleaf pine, or the amount of DNA of a species chromosome, is 21.73 pg when measured utilizing laser flow cytometry.

The genome of the shortleaf pine is not sequenced; however, loblolly pine genomic information can be used in comparative genetic studies regarding the shortleaf pine.

The United States Department of Agriculture (USDA) launched a genetic improvement program in the 1960s that aimed to increase the genetic diversity of the species, which is crucial for effective restoration of the species, by breeding trees and conducting progeny tests. This program posed inadvertent effects, as it opened the opportunity of crossbreeding with the loblolly pine. Fast growth is a desirable trait among trees, and this is usually a characteristic of hybrid trees; in turn, breeders are inclined to select these traits. Shortleaf pine orchards are also often adjacent to loblolly pine orchards, which could cause hybrid breeding to occur as well.
