= Vladimir Beklemishev (zoologist) =

Russian scientist (1890–1962)

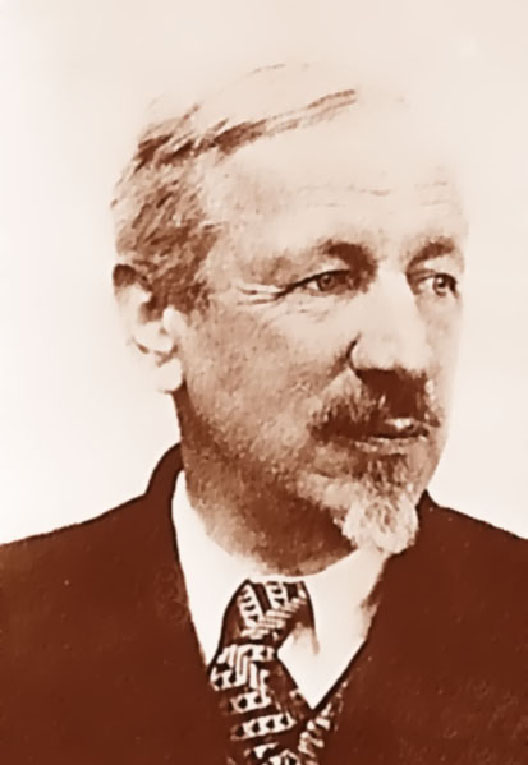
Vladimir Nikolaevich Beklemishev

Vladimir Nikolayevich Beklemishev (Russian: Владимир Николаевич Беклемишев; 4 October [O.S. 22 September] 1890, Hrodna – 4 September 1962, Moscow) was a Russian zoologist and entomologist.

Beklemishev was born in Grodno where his father Nikolai Dmitrievich was a doctor. He graduated from the Grodno Gymnasium in 1908 and went to study at Saint Petersburg University. He graduated in 1913 and studied under V.A. Dogel. In 1914 he took part in a Caspian expedition under N.M. Knipovich, collecting turbellaria. In 1918 he moved to Perm where he held the post of a docent at the recently opened Perm University, becoming professor of the same university in 1920. After 1932 he was the head of the Division of Entomology of the Institute of Malaria and Medical Parasitology in Moscow (now the Institute of Medical Parasitology and Tropical Medicine (IM). After 1934 he became the professor of the Department of Zoology and Comparative Anatomy of Moscow State University. During his career he was particularly involved with medical entomology. He used an ecological approach to dealing with malaria and its transmission, as well as tick-borne encephalitis and other arthropod-borne diseases. Beklemishev was an active member of the Academy of Medical Sciences (AMN) (1945) and Polish AN (1949), an Honoured Scientist of the RSFSR (1947) and twice received the Stalin Prize award (1944, 1952).

== Selected works ==
- The basis of the comparative anatomy of the invertebrates (1944,1950,1964).
- Medical entomology (1949).
- The basis of comparative parasitology. Medical Science. (1976)(first published?).
- Methodology of systematics. KMK Scientific Press Ltd. (1994).(first published?)
