= Bury Me in Redwood Country =

- DVD Cover Artwork
- Directed by: Benjamin Greené and Benj Cameron
- Music by: Johannes Ockeghem's Missa Caput performed by Grain de la Voix
- Release date: October 2009
- Running time: 62 minutes
- Country: United States
- Language: English

Bury Me in Redwood Country is a 2009 documentary film about the Redwood forest landscape. It is a meditative look at the tallest and largest trees on the planet, offering a reverential perspective that approaches the ecstatic. The film includes interviews with Redwoods experts, foresters, conservationists, native basketweavers, rangers and naturalists, including Steve Sillet and Michael Taylor. The project encapsulated a year of shooting in diverse locations in Redwood National and State Parks, Humboldt Redwoods State Park, Montgomery Woods State Reserve, Sequoia National Park, and others.

== Screenings ==
- Opening Night Film, Northwest Projections Film Festival, Bellingham, WA
- Feature, Local Sightings Film Festival, Seattle, WA
- Bainbridge Performing Arts, Bainbridge Island, WA
- Vashon Theatre, Vashon Island, WA
- Brown Bag Lunch, Redwood National Park, Orick, CA
- DOCTOBER, Pickford Film Center, Bellingham, WA
- Wild Rivers 101 Film Festival, Arcata, CA
- Whatcom Museum, Bellingham, WA

== See also ==
- Sequoia sempervirens
- Sequoiadendron giganteum
- Sequoia (genus)
- Redwood National and State Parks
- Sequoia National Park
- Kings Canyon National Park
- Yosemite National Park
- Calaveras Big Trees State Park
