= Albino redwood =

Mutant redwood tree with little to no chlorophyll

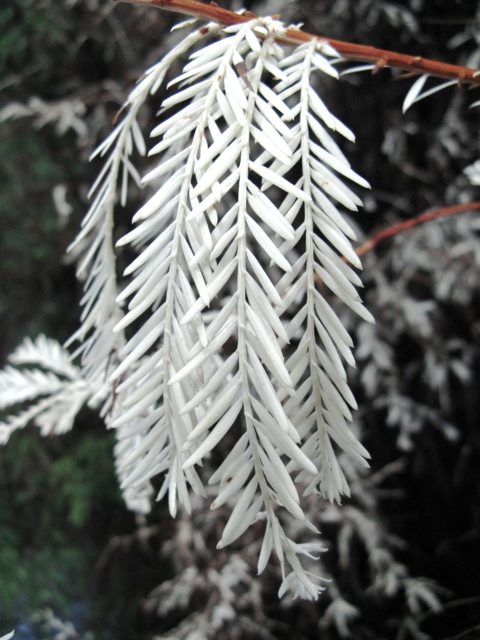
Foliage of an 'albino' redwood

An albino redwood is a redwood tree which is partially or totally unable to produce chlorophyll, and therefore has only white needles instead of the normal green. (Note: Albinism is defined in various ways; see Albinism in biology)

== History ==
=== Indigenous cultural significance ===
The trees were important to Native Americans and were recorded in their legends. For example, the Pomo people used them in their cleansing ceremonies.

=== Early records ===
Albino redwoods generated a lot of interest from travelers who would stumble upon them. In a story from 1899, a state senator is said to have brought back white redwood boughs from his vacation in the Sonoma Mountains. The boughs caught the interest of the State Agricultural society, which attempted to preserve some of the foliage. The reporter went on to explain that such trees were also known to exist in the Monterey Bay area, where locals had been accustomed to their sight for some time.

Some early reporting could be prone to exaggeration about the size and color of the trees. In 1906, the nephew of Secretary of State Charles Curry claimed to have found a pure white tree some 250 feet in height in a deep canyon of Sonoma County.

== Biology ==
=== Description ===
Albino redwoods survive by obtaining sugar through the connections between its roots and those of neighboring normal redwood(s), usually the parent tree from whose base it has sprouted. Sap exchange through roots is a general phenomenon among redwoods. About 400 are known. They can be found in Henry Cowell Redwoods State Park, Humboldt Redwoods State Park, San Francisco Botanical Garden, Huddart Park, and The Santa Lucia Preserve, with eleven trees in the first. The exact locations are not publicized to protect the rare trees. They reach a maximum height of about 20 m (66 ft). Other conifers lack the ability to graft their roots, so 'albino' mutants of other species do not survive to become sizable trees.

Six phenotypes of albino redwood have been classified: white, bright yellow, cellular virescent green, pale green, mottled and nonchimeric variegated. Such mutants can be either basal (growing from a burl at the base of a tree) or aerial (branching off from a tree above the ground). The bright yellow form is exclusively aerial and is thought to be associated with excess xanthophyll production. The pale green form lacks just one specific type of chlorophyll and is almost always basal. Cellular virescent green trees have a few normal cells (whose abundance may vary over time) interspersed among the mutant cells.

=== Chimeras ===
Ten cases are known of chimeric redwoods that have a mosaic of albino and normal tissues. Only a single chimeric redwood is known to produce cones. Formerly threatened by the Sonoma–Marin Area Rail Transit rail development, it has since been replanted.

Three phenotypes of chimeric redwoods have been noted: sectorial, mericlinal and periclinal. In sectorial mutants, albino cells are present vertically through all cell layers, with genotype boundaries usually parallel to the stem. Mericlinal trees have mutant cells in only some cell layers and have an unstable phenotype; the albino cells can disappear and reappear in successive years. A periclinal chimera has both mutant and normal cells distributed horizontally across the tip of each bud propagating at equal rates, leading to a very stable phenotype.

=== Role ===
Albino redwoods are generally regarded as parasitic plants. Any species of vascular plant has the potential to inherit and express albinism, but only redwoods can produce enough nutrients (through the host/parent tree) to survive past the seedling stage.

== Gallery ==
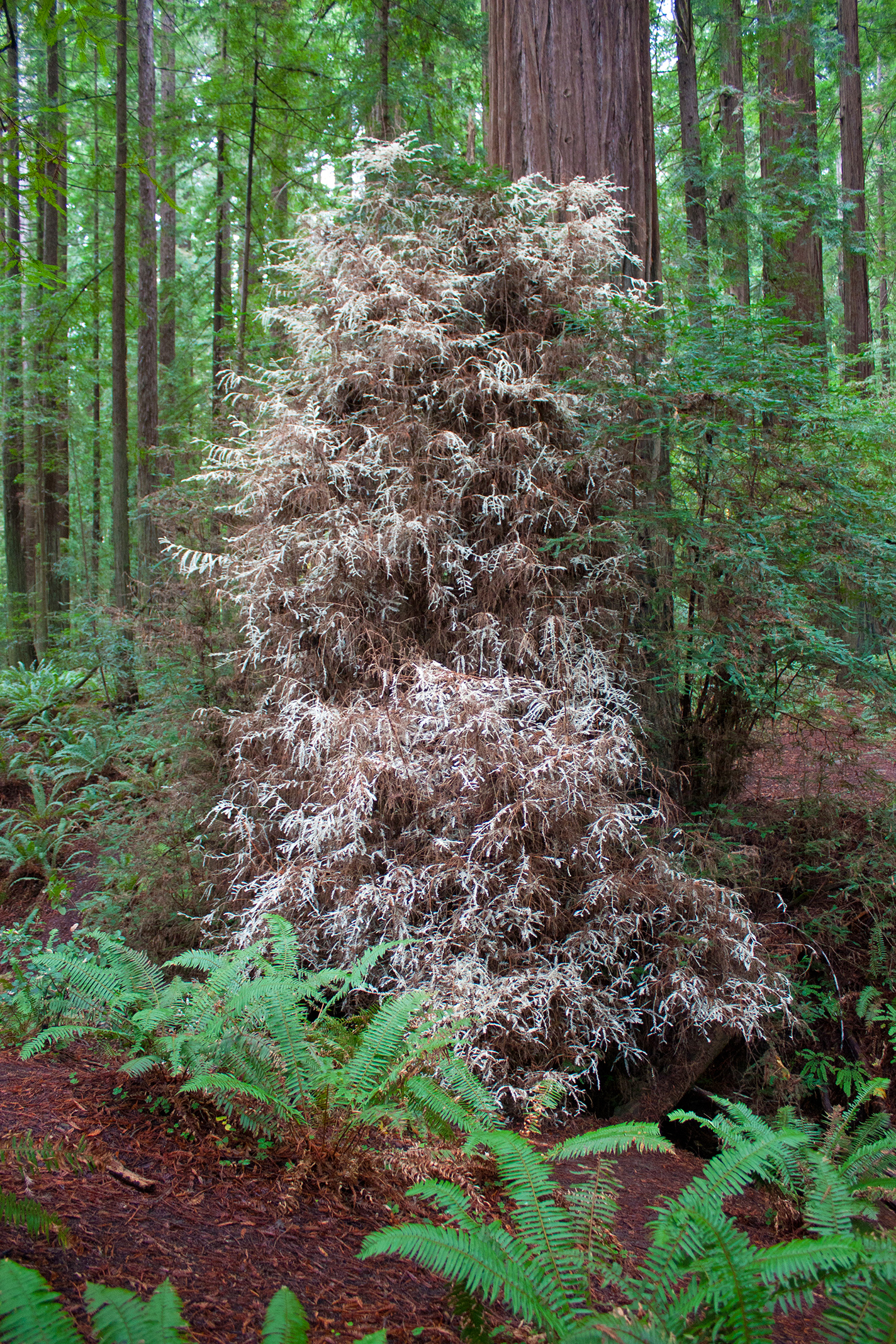
An 'albino' redwood in Humboldt Redwoods State Park, northern California

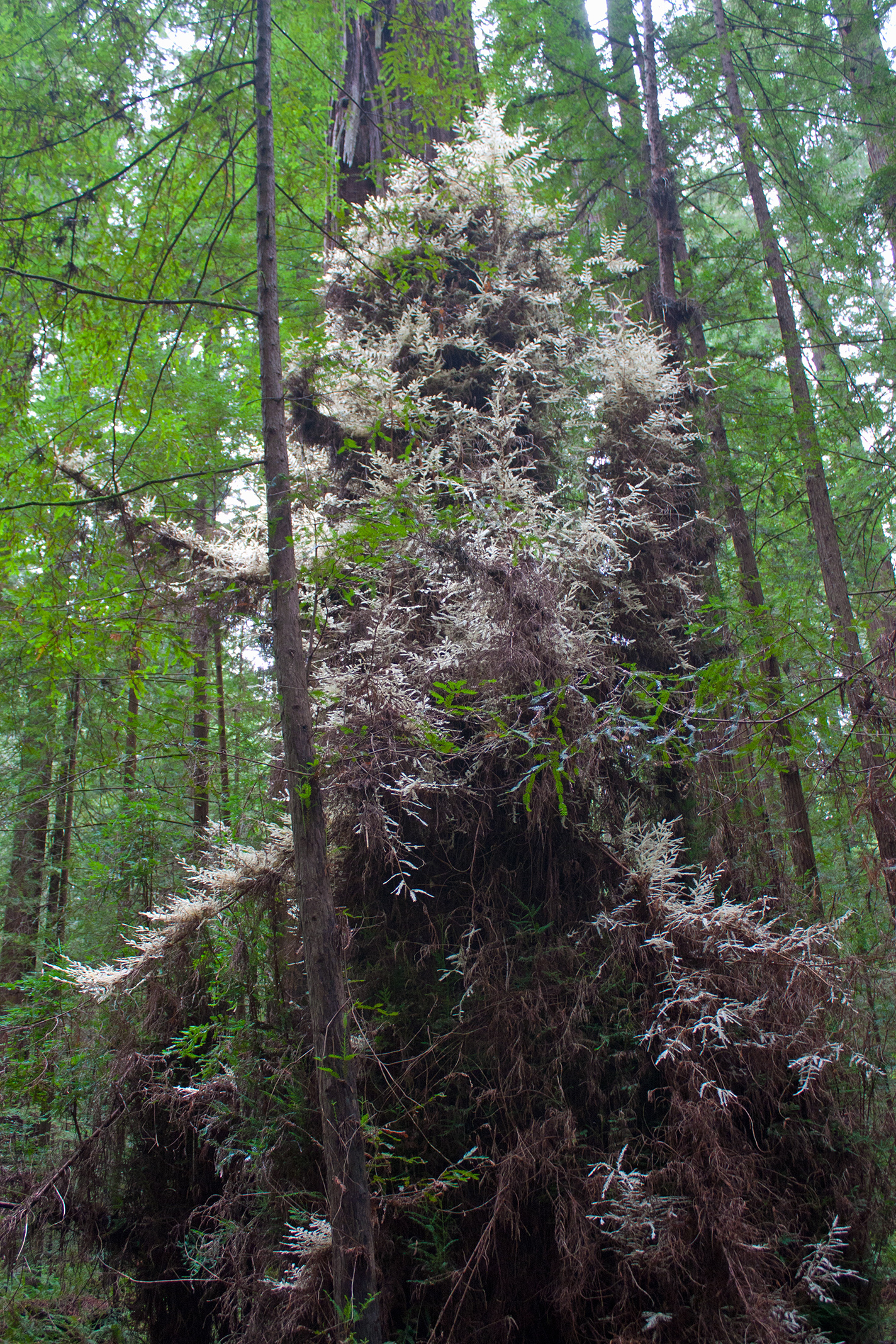
Another example in Humboldt Redwoods State Park

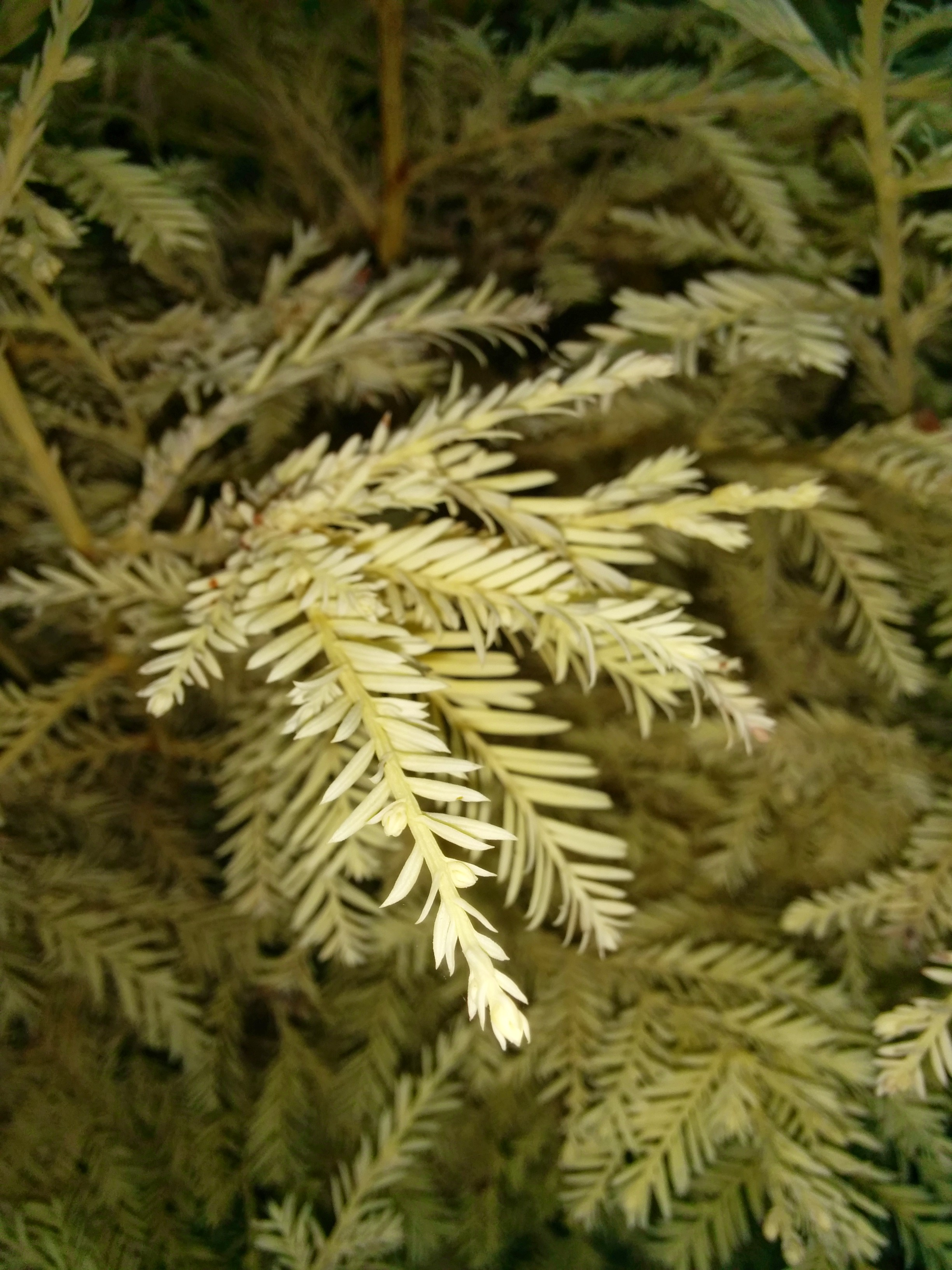
Albino foliage in the Santa Cruz Mountains, California

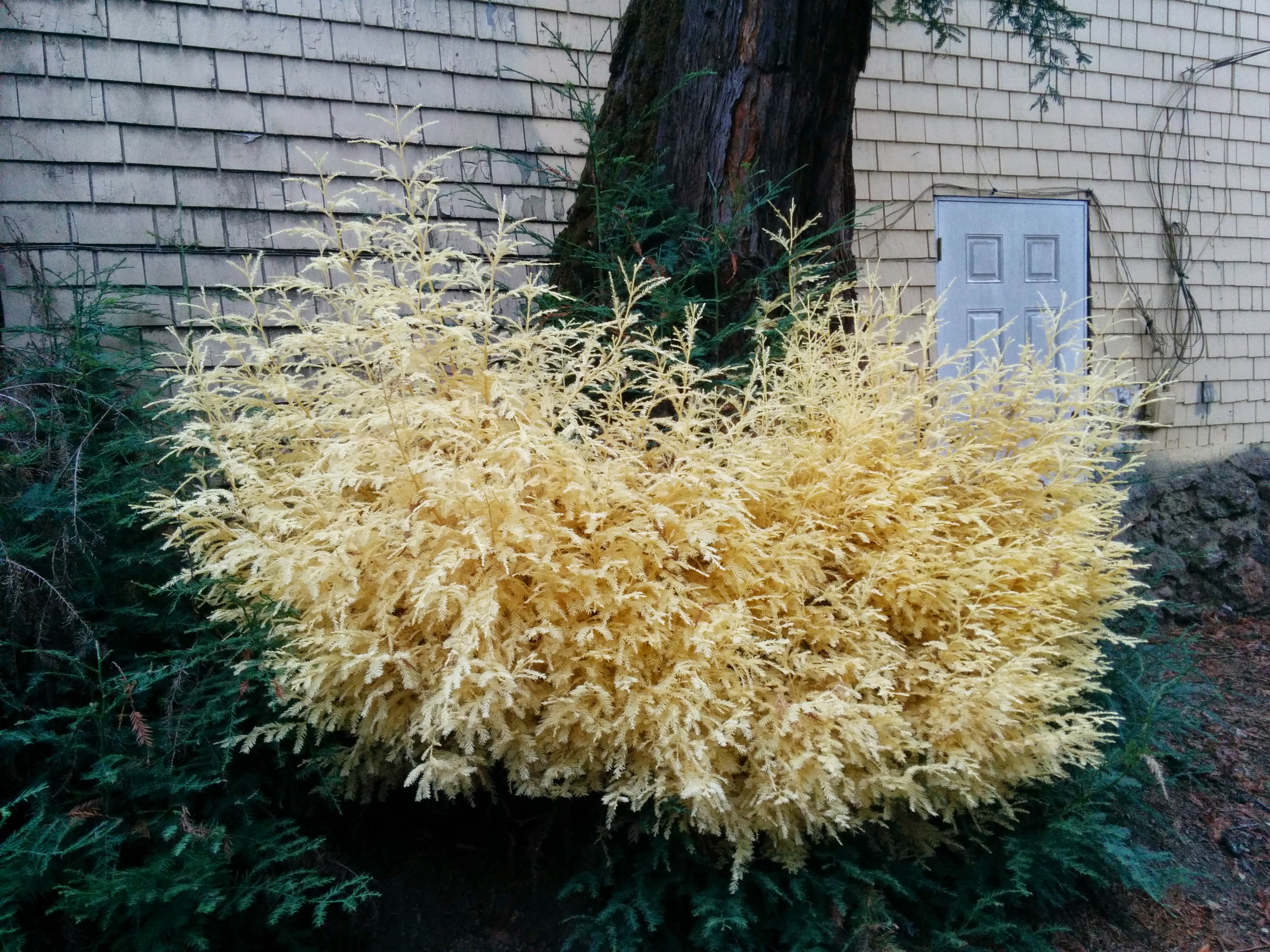
Example in the Santa Cruz Mountains

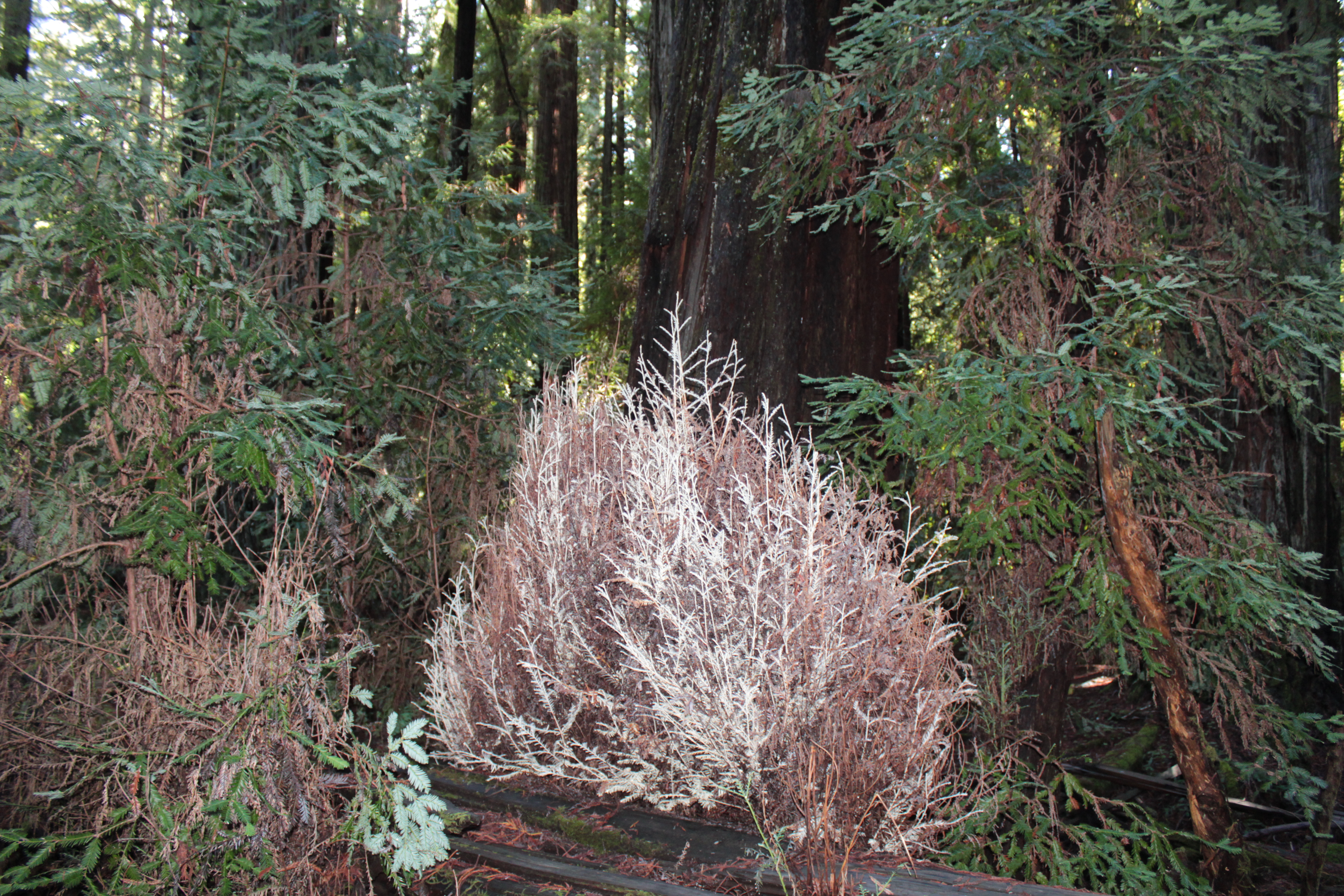
Example of an Albino Redwood tree in Montgomery Redwood State Reserve

== Additional reading ==
- Davis, D. F.; Holderman, D. F. (February 1, 1980). The white redwoods: ghosts of the forest. Naturegraph Publishers. ISBN 978-0-87961-088-3.
