= Atlas Grove =

Grove of Coast redwood trees in Humboldt County, California

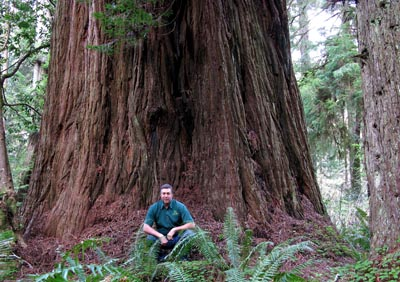
Arborist M.D. Vaden in front of the coast redwood Iluvatar, a tree of the Atlas Grove.

Atlas Grove is a grove of Coast redwood trees (Sequoia sempervirens) within Prairie Creek Redwoods State Park, in Humboldt County, northern California. It contains the third largest known Coast redwood, Iluvatar.

== Description ==
According to author Richard Preston, the Atlas Grove was discovered by naturalist Michael Taylor in 1991. For old growth specimens importance, the Atlas Grove is similar to the Grove of Titans, another undisclosed grove of first growth Coast redwoods in the park. The exact locations of both are undisclosed, to protect their ecology.

Among tree hunters and botanists, some groves and trees are given names unofficially. However, over 900 Coast redwood groves have been named by the Save the Redwoods League, as an "everlasting memorial to an individual, family or organization". It has not been disclosed whether the Atlas Grove is one of the dedicated memorial groves.

== Botany ==
An area of approximately 1 hectare in the Atlas Grove was studied, known as the Atlas Project. The exact location of the study is undisclosed.

Trees in the stand were measured with tapes and laser range finders. Over 20 days with 5 climbers was spent just in measuring the Iluvatar tree. Scientific studies were done with moisture, light, and sap flow sensors. Wildlife in the grove was studied too, including the Wandering salamander (Aneides vagrans).

The Atlas Grove contains other old growth Coast redwoods, including: the Atlas Tree, Gaia, Pleiades, Ballantine, Prometheus, and the Bell Tree.

Other flora in the Atlas Grove includes: Douglas-fir (Pseudotsuga menziesii), Sitka spruce (Picea sitchensis), Bigleaf maple (Acer macrophyllum), Cascara buckthorn (Rhamnus purshiana), California laurel (Umbellularia californica), Western hemlock (Tsuga heterophylla), Port Orford–cedar (Chamaecyparis lawsoniana) and Tanoak (Lithocarpus densiflorus).

== See also ==
- Coast redwood groves
- Redwood National and State Parks
