= Bull Creek (Humboldt County) =

River in California, United States

- Old-growth redwood forest of the Bull Creek floodplain

Location
- Country: United States
- State: California
- County: Humboldt County

Physical characteristics
- Source
  - coordinates: 40°15′36″N 123°59′15″W
- Mouth: South Fork Eel River
  - coordinates: 40°20′57″N 124°00′04″W
  - elevation: 272 ft (83 m)
- Basin size: 41 mi^{2} (110 km^{2})

Basin features
- Progression: South Fork Eel → Eel → Pacific Ocean

Bull Creek is the largest Eel River tributary drainage basin preserved within Humboldt Redwoods State Park. The basin contains the world's largest remaining contiguous old-growth forest of coast redwoods. Bull Creek flows in a clockwise semi-circle around 3,373-foot (1,028-meter) Grasshopper Mountain to enter the South Fork Eel River approximately 1.5 miles (2.4 km) upstream of the South Fork confluence with the Eel River.

== Old-growth forest ==
The forest that grows in the alluvial flats along Bull Creek contain the highest recorded biomass of any forest in the world. This forest also has as the world's highest canopy—as measured by the average height of the mature trees. The average height of canopy trees along Bull Creek exceeds 300 feet (91 meters), and several trees in this forest exceed 360 feet (110 meters).

The forest canopy is dominated by mature coast redwoods, many of which are over 1000 years old. Smaller populations of Tanoak, California laurel, and Douglas fir are present alongside the creek itself and in gaps in the canopy. Because of the dense canopy, very little light reaches the ground, which is covered primarily by a carpet of shade-tolerant Redwood sorrel.

The Bull Creek forest contains several of the world's largest and tallest trees, including the Stratosphere Giant, which was the tallest known tree in the world between its discovery in 2000 and 2006, and the Bull Creek Giant, the largest tree in Humboldt Redwoods State Park.

== History ==
Early attempts to preserve individual redwood trees and small groves of trees led to an improved understanding of the interdependence of forest ecosystems. Species important to the centuries-old coastal redwood trees include aquatic plants and animals within adjacent streams. The entire Bull Creek drainage basin is protected within park boundaries to avoid upstream water quality changes detrimental to aquatic residents of the floodplain where the largest trees grow. Redwood trees control the rate of erosion within the drainage basin. Large-diameter, rot-resistant trunks of fallen redwood trees may resist erosion more effectively than the friable upper Cretaceous marine sedimentary and metasedimentary bedrock of the drainage basin.

Founders Grove on the Bull Creek flood plain was within 9,400 acres (3,800 hectares) purchased in 1931 by the Save the Redwoods League. Timber on land upslope of Founders Grove was harvested in 1947. Heavy rains in December 1955 washed soil, rocks, and debris from the deforested slopes; and this debris flood felled three hundred trees with trunks more than 4-foot (1.2 m) in diameter within the downslope grove. Four hundred more large trees were felled from the grove by the Christmas flood of 1964. Most of the remainder of the Bull Creek watershed was subsequently purchased by Save-the-Redwoods League to encourage upslope forest management practices more similar to natural processes.

== See also ==
- List of rivers in California
