= Montgomery Woods State Natural Reserve =

State-owned park in California, US

- IUCN category V (protected landscape/seascape)
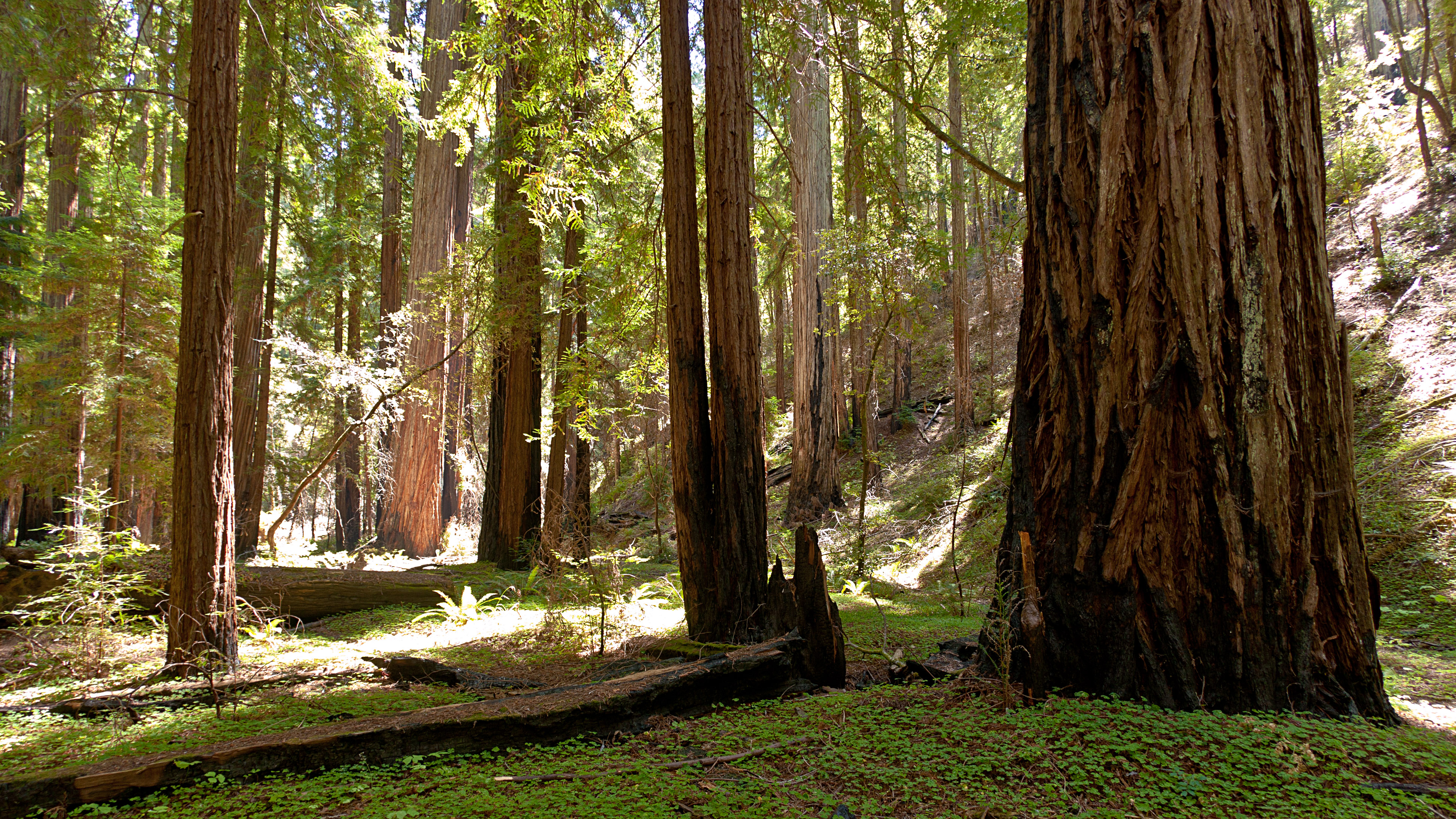
- Redwood grove at Montgomery Woods

- Location within California Location within the United States
- Location: Mendocino County, California
- Nearest city: Ukiah, California
- Coordinates: 39°14′N 123°23′W
- Area: 1,323 acres (535 ha)
- Established: 1945
- Governing body: California Department of Parks and Recreation

Montgomery Woods State Natural Reserve is a 1,323-acre (535 ha) state-owned park located in the Coastal Range in Mendocino County, California, United States. The reserve is home to an abundance of old-growth redwood trees. The reserve is located in a valley, and the unique and steep geographic location protected the trees from the lumber industry before it was established as a state reserve in 1945.

== Geography ==
The reserve occupies the headwaters of Montgomery Creek, a tributary of Big River, which flows into the Pacific Ocean at Mendocino Headlands State Park. The virgin groves of Coast Redwood (Sequoia sempervirens) in Montgomery Woods are examples of a now rare upland riparian meadow habitat; most other preserved redwood groves are on broad alluvial plains. The reserve is accessed from a parking area along Orr Springs Road 13 miles (21 km) west of Ukiah and 15 miles (24 km) east of Comptche. A moderately steep trail from the parking area climbs uphill along Montgomery Creek about three-quarters of a mile. Once in the grove, the trail makes a meandering three miles (4.8 km) loop, with substantial use of boardwalks to protect the fragile forest floor.

== History ==
Previous to the arrival of settlers, this area of land held up to 2 million acres of old-growth forest. Over time, due to heavy logging and cutting, this number was brought down to an estimated 100,000 acres (40,000 ha). The reserve was initiated by a 9-acre (3.6 ha) donation from Robert T. Orr in 1945, with 765 acres (310 hectares) donated since 1947 by the Save the Redwoods League. This reserve contains 18 coast redwood trees taller than 350 feet and 4 trees taller than 360 feet.

== Wildlife ==
Birds that can be found in the reserve include American Robins, Pacific Wrens, Cedar Waxwings, and Chestnut-backed Chickadees. Mule deer and Foothill yellow-legged frogs inhabit the area, as well as many different species of newt. This includes the Coast Range California newt, the Rough Skinned newt and the Red Bellied newt.

== Weather ==
The weather varies with the seasons, as summer temperatures tend to reach the higher 80s nearing July, while winter temperatures tend to get low to below 40 degrees. Trails will often flood in colder months when there is heavy rainfall.

== Tallest tree ==
Between 1999 and 2004, the tallest tree in Montgomery Woods, named the Mendocino Tree, was the world's tallest known tree. It was displaced by the discovery of a number of taller trees in Humboldt Redwoods State Park and later Redwood National Park in Humboldt County. The tree is one of dozens of similar height in the grove, and was never specifically marked in order to protect the tree. Earlier well-publicized candidates for the world's tallest tree suffered damage from stresses resulting from crowds of tourists. Tourists and visitors would walk around the base of the tree when it was marked as the tallest, which would result in the roots being trodden upon and the tree being damaged.
