= Stratosphere Giant =

4th tallest known living tree

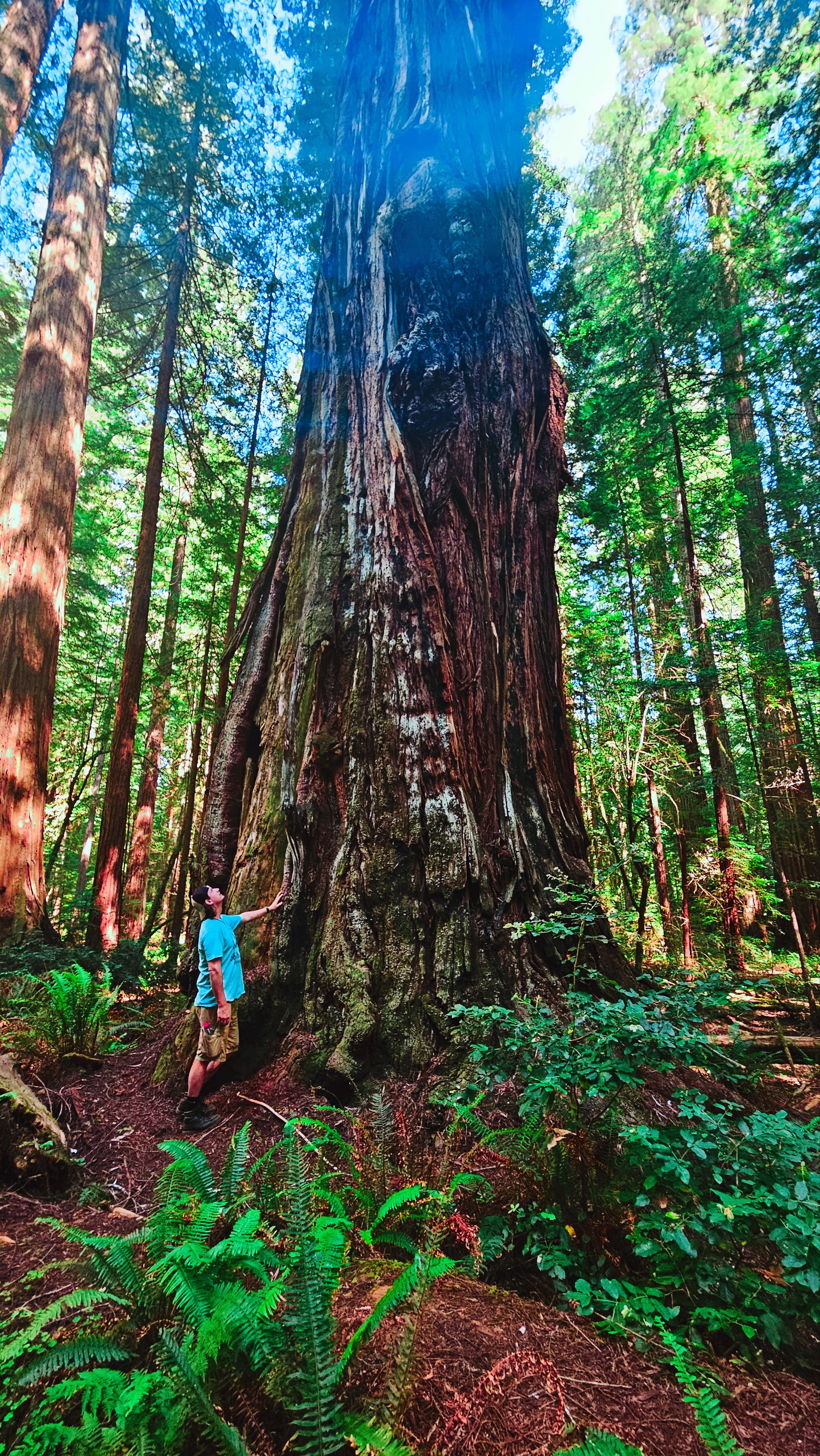
- NOTE: This map is not the exact location of the tree, that information is not publicly available.
- Interactive map of Stratosphere Giant
- Species: Coast redwood (Sequoia sempervirens)
- Height: 113.61 m (372.7 ft)

The Stratosphere Giant was once considered the tallest tree in the world. It was discovered in July 2000 growing along Bull Creek in Humboldt Redwoods State Park by Chris Atkins, measuring 112.34 meters (368.6 ft) tall. The discovery was confirmed and made public in 2004, displacing the Mendocino Tree, another coast redwood, from the record books. The tree has continued to grow and measured 113.11 m (371.1 ft) in 2010 and 113.61 m (372.7 ft) in 2013. It is a specimen of the species Sequoia sempervirens, the Coast Redwood. The tree features three prominent burls on the southwestern side of its trunk and is surrounded by a large number of trees of almost equal size. In an effort to avoid damage to the tree's shallow roots by tourism, its exact location was never disclosed to the public.

On August 25, 2006, a taller redwood tree, named Hyperion, in the Redwood National Park was discovered by Chris Atkins and Michael Taylor, and is considered the tallest tree (and living thing), measuring 115.55 m (379.1 ft). This has been confirmed using a tape measurement. Two other trees in this forest were found to be taller than Stratosphere Giant as well, though Stratosphere Giant is now believed to have grown taller than one of them.

== See also ==
- Sequoia—Statistics section
- Orders of magnitude (length)
- List of individual trees
