= The Mendocino Tree =

Coast redwood tree

The Mendocino Tree is a coast redwood (Sequoia sempervirens) located in Montgomery Woods State Natural Reserve in Mendocino County, California.

From 1999 to 2004, it was believed to be the tallest tree in the world, measuring 367.5 feet (112.0 m) tall. It took the record from a slightly taller tree in Del Norte County, California, after that tree lost height when it was damaged in a storm. A team led by Stephen C. Sillett measured the height of the Mendocino Tree, which was verified by the Guinness Book of World Records. The taller Stratosphere Giant, discovered in 2000, was confirmed to be taller in 2004, and soon afterwards in 2006 the even taller Hyperion took the current record.

Montgomery Woods is remote and "the least visited of Mendocino County's redwood preserves". Nevertheless, because of the difficulty of managing the large number of visitors to the park wishing to see the tree, and potentially damaging its root system, its precise location within Montgomery Woods remains undisclosed, and difficult to discern among dozens of redwoods that are nearly as tall.
