= Iluvatar (tree) =

Specific coast redwood tree

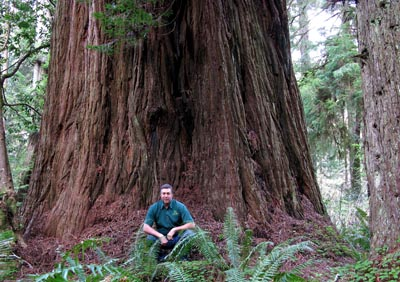
- Arborist M.D. Vaden next to the coastal redwood Ilúvatar in 2008. The groundcover plants are western sword fern and redwood sorrel.
- Species: Coast redwood (Sequoia sempervirens)
- Height: 91.5 m (300 ft)
- Diameter: 6.1 m (20 ft)
- Volume of trunk: 1,032.8 m^{3} (36,470 ft^{3})

Iluvatar is a redwood tree in Prairie Creek Redwoods State Park in Northern California that has been measured to be 6.1 meters (20 ft) in diameter at breast height, and 91.5 meters (300 ft) in height. Measured by botanist Stephen C. Sillett, it is the world's third-largest coast redwood, the largest being Lost Monarch.

Iluvatar is located among a group of trees called Atlas Grove. The location is unpublished. Atlas Grove, including Iluvatar, is a carefully studied area of forest. Measuring Iluvatar required five climbers for over 20 days. Iluvatar has 134 reiterated trunks, more than any except the Redwood Creek Giant. Its first reiterated trunk is 2.6 meters in diameter, the largest reiteration on any redwood. In total, reiterations account for 12.3 percent of its stemwood volume.

Like many old growth redwoods, trunks within the crown are hydraulically linked by fused branches. In addition to allowing for water transfer within the crown, these fusions strengthen the crown of the tree, making it more resilient to wind damage. Iluvatar has 30 such fusions.

This redwood tree was named by Sillett after Eru Ilúvatar, the creator of the universe in J. R. R. Tolkien's legendarium, in which his novels The Hobbit, The Lord of the Rings and The Silmarillion take place.

The Atlas Grove (with Iluvatar) is said by author Richard Preston to have been discovered by naturalist Michael Taylor in 1991.

This coastal redwood is surrounded by other old coastal redwoods including Atlas Tree, Gaia, Pleiades, Ballantine, Prometheus, Bell, Zeus and others. Ballantine was named after a real man. Some were named after ancient Greek gods. Neighboring species include Pseudotsuga menziesii, Picea sitchensis, Acer macrophyllum, Rhamnus purshiana, Umbellularia californica, Tsuga heterophylla, Chamaecyparis lawsoniana and Lithocarpus densiflorus.

== See also ==
- List of individual trees
