= Humboldt Redwoods State Park =

State park in Humboldt County, California, United States

- The "darkness at noon" effect is synonymous with redwood groves

- Location within California Location within the United States
- Location: Humboldt County, California, United States
- Nearest city: Rio Dell, California
- Coordinates: 40°18′43″N 123°58′18″W
- Area: 51,651 acres (209.02 km^{2})
- Established: 1921
- Governing body: California Department of Parks and Recreation

Humboldt Redwoods State Park is a state park of California, United States, containing Rockefeller Forest, the world's largest remaining contiguous old-growth forest of coast redwoods. It is located 30 miles (48 km) south of Eureka, California, near Weott in southern Humboldt County, within Northern California, named after the great German nineteenth-century scientist, Alexander von Humboldt. The park was established by the Save the Redwoods League in 1921 largely from lands purchased from the Pacific Lumber Company. Beginning with the dedication of the Raynal Bolling Memorial Grove, it has grown to become the third-largest park in the California State Park system, now containing 51,651 acres (20,902 ha) through acquisitions and gifts to the state. Part of the natural area is old-growth forest and recognized by Old-Growth Forest Network.

It is part of the Northern California coastal forests ecoregion and has 23,600 acres (96 km^{2}) of old-growth forests. 17,000 acres (69 km^{2}) are old-growth redwoods, comprising the entire Bull Creek watershed and the Rockefeller Forest. Only 5% of old coastal redwood forests remain.

Nearby U.S. Route 101, which generally follows the Eel River and its South Fork in this part of the North Coast, offers easy access to the park and nearby towns with connections to the scenic highway, Avenue of the Giants, also mostly located within or near park boundaries.

== History ==
Rockefeller Forest contains the world's largest remaining tract of old-growth redwood trees

The original inhabitants of the area were the Sinkyone. In the 1850s white settlers began felling the redwoods, seeking to clear the land for homes and pasture. About 20 years later the timber industry moved into the region, and railways and roads were routed through the area for accessibility to the trees. In 1918 after realizing how much of the old-growth forests closer to San Francisco had been harvested, Boone and Crockett Club members formed the Save the Redwoods League, and began working to preserve redwood forests in the region, including the area that became Humboldt Redwoods State Park. The Garden Club of America, through its Redwood Grove Committee, raised half of the funds needed to buy the 2,552 acre Canoe Creek Grove which became part of Humboldt Redwoods State Park. Sarah Gildersleeve Fife was instrumental in the activities of this committee.

== Redwoods ==
Many of the coast redwoods (Sequoia sempervirens) grow to over 300 feet (91 m) in height. The forests on alluvial plains are almost pure redwood forest, but the forests on the slopes also contain Douglas-fir.

Over 100 of the 137 known trees over 350 feet (110 m) tall—all coast redwoods—occur in Humboldt Redwoods State Park. It is home to the 4th-tallest measured living redwood, the Stratosphere Giant, which was measured at 112.94 metres (370.5 ft) in 2004. Stratosphere Giant was the tallest known living redwood until the discovery of three taller trees in Redwood National Park; the tallest, Hyperion, measuring 115.55 metres (379.1 ft) in September 2006.

Before the discovery of Hyperion, the tallest redwood ever measured was the Dyerville Giant, also in Humboldt Redwoods State Park. It was 113.4 metres (372 ft) high when it fell in March 1991. It was estimated to be 1,600 years old. The Dyerville Giant can be seen on Founders Grove Nature Trail, which honors the creators of Save the Redwoods League. Also in this grove is Founders Tree, which is 346 feet (105 m) tall with circumference of 40 feet (12 m). There is also an albino redwood referred to as the Christmas Tree.

== Wildlife ==
The park has a variety of wildlife such as black-tailed deer, California ground squirrels, gray foxes, Dusky-footed woodrat, Hoary bat, Steller's jay and raccoons.

== Recreation ==
Meadow adjacent to Albee Creek Campground

The Avenue of the Giants is a 32 miles (51 km) drive through Humboldt Redwoods State Park with eight stops along an auto tour of park highlights. The park has over 100 miles (160 km) of hiking trails. There is also horseback riding, mountain biking, fishing, and swimming in the South Fork Eel River. The park is prone to fire hazards, and camping is permitted in specified areas. Almost 250 sites are available for use, including an equestrian camp. Nearby Burlington, serves as a main camping spot, alongside Albee.

== See also ==
- List of California state parks
- Redwood National and State Parks
