= Charles Post (ecologist) =

American ecologist, filmmaker, photographer and podcaster

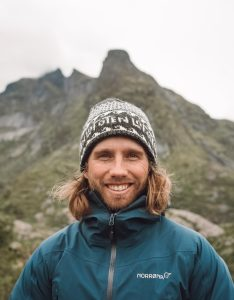
- Born: Charles Gifford Post; July 28, 1988; San Francisco, California
- Education: University of California, Berkeley
- Occupations: Filmmaker, photographer, ecologist
- Organization: The Nature Project
- Known for: films, environmental activity, photography
- Spouse: Rachel Pohl
- Website: www.charlespost.com

Charles G. Post is an American ecologist, documentary filmmaker, photographer and podcaster. He is best known for his photography work and as producer and film director of Sky Migrations, Return of the Desert Bighorn and Golden. His photography and writing work have appeared on National Geographic, Outside, Yeti and Sierra Magazine. Post is co-founder and Vice President of The Nature Project (501c3), a non-profit organization with the focus on helping underserved youth.

== Biography ==
Charles Post was born and brought up in San Francisco Bay Area, Marin County, California. Post entered the University of California, Berkeley, where he earned a bachelor's degree in food web ecology. Continuing his studies at U.C. Berkeley, he received his Master of Science degree in 2015 with his main focus being on Integrative Biology. Charles Post is married to Rachel Pohl, a nature visual artist and mountaineer, who is also on the Matador 2022 Travel Awards Panel.

== Environmental projects and editorial work ==
During his graduate school tenure at U.C. Berkeley's College of Letters and Sciences, Charles began working on research projects at the Angelo Coast Range Reserve under the mentorship of renowned ecologist Dr. Mary Eleanor Power. Charles has contributed and published his photography and editorial work in publications like Outside Magazine, Sierra Magazine, Yeti and National Geographic. Between 2017 and 2020, he was an editor at Modern Huntsman. In 2016, Charles Post co-founded The Nature Project, a non-profit that organizes outdoor trips for under-served youth together with ecologists, environmental activists and renowned sportspeople. Post is a National Fellow at The Explorers Club.

== Filmmaking ==
Shortly after graduation, Charles received the Huckberry Explorer's Grant and gained photography experience during his Alaska trip with Chris Burkard. Since then, Charles Post has directed and produced a number of short films about relationship between human society and rapidly changing natural environments. His films range from his first production role as associate producer of Island Earth (2016), directed by Emmy Award Winning filmmaker, Cyrus Sutton, and Sky Migrations (2017), the first film Charles co-directed, which was a finalist at the Banff Mountain Film Festival. Sky Migrations was also invited to join additional United States tours as part of the Wild and Scenic Film Festival and Telluride Mountainfilm Festival, which screened his film across 42 cities, nationwide. His most recent film, Golden (2020), explores the journey of a young raptor ecologist who chases her dream to pursue a career studying eagles in the American West.

== Radio and Podcasts ==
Post is a frequent guest on many podcasts related to the environment, ecology, adventure and hunting. He has been on numerous shows including MeatEater Network podcasts, Ari in the Air, Finisterre, Journal of Mountain Hunting, Mountain & Prairie Podcast, The Kyle Thiermann Show, Into the Wilderness and The Rich Outdoors.

Post also took part in the MeatEater's Network podcasts on The Hunting Collective podcast with Ben O'Brien in four Episodes, and Mark Kenyon's Wired to Hunt podcast in Episode 217. In Episode 38, they discussed ecology and hunting, and how the two themes interconnect, specifically covering the highly contested topic of grizzly bear management in the Greater Yellowstone Ecosystem.

== Filmography ==
Year	Title	Credit	Notes
2020	Golden	Director/Producer	Documentary short
2019	Horse Rich & Dirt Poor	Co-director	Documentary short (Co-directed with Ben Masters)
2019	Return of the Desert Bighorn	Co-director	Documentary short (Co-directed by Ben Masters and Charles Post; University of Idaho Fish and Wildlife Film Festival, Winner, 2019)
2017	Sky Migrations	Co-director	Missoula International Wildlife Film Festival (Special Jury Prize); Banff Mountain Film Festival (finalist) (Co-directed with Max Lowe)
2016	Island Earth	Associate producer	Documentary
