= California Coast Ranges Biosphere Reserve =

Coordinates: 38.7900°N 122.9000°W

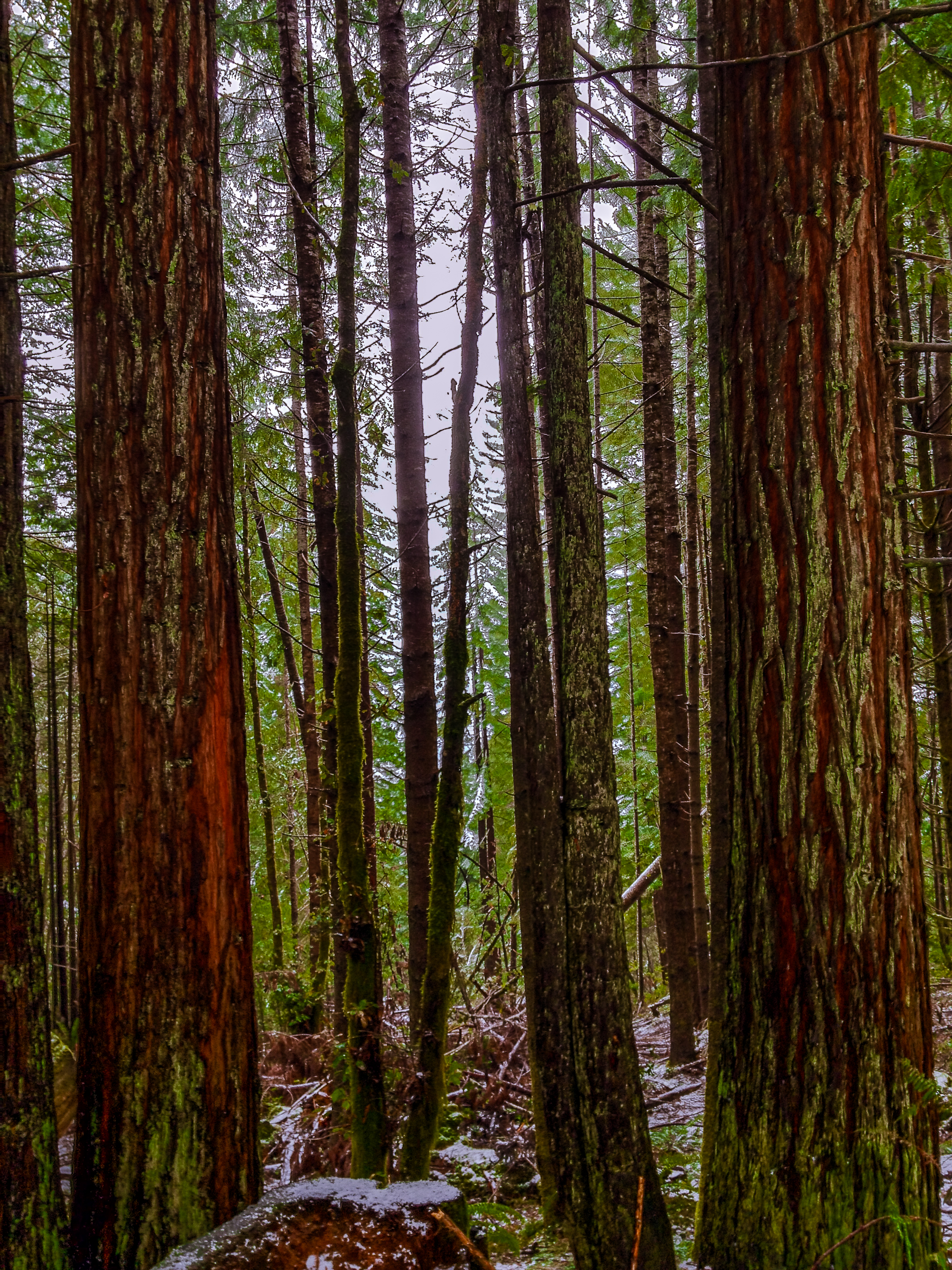
Lady Bird Johnson Grove in Redwood State Park, part of the California Coast Ranges reserve

The California Coast Ranges Biosphere Reserve (established 1983) was a UNESCO Biosphere reserve located along the California Coast Ranges of northern California and the San Francisco Bay area until June 2017. This biosphere reserve includes a highly diverse complex of evergreen sclerophyllous woodland, coastal, estuary and marine ecosystems.

== Purpose ==
The city of San Francisco is a focal point for coastal industry and trade. Tourism, some agriculture and fisheries, transportation, manufacturing, military installations, and research and educational institutions are also important to the regional economy.

The primary aim of the biosphere reserve is to develop a commitment to ecosystem management among the various management agencies. Given the intense human pressure of the area, the conservation of biodiversity is very challenging. Of particular concern is to raise environmental awareness among the diverse urban communities.

== Sites ==
The 621-square-kilometer (240-square-mile) California Coast Ranges reserve encompasses a number of protected sites under management by various state and federal agencies:

- Jackson Demonstration State Forest (California Department of Forestry and Fire Protection)
- Landels-Hill Big Creek Reserve (University of California Natural Reserve System)
- Heath & Marjorie Angelo Coast Range Preserve (University of California Natural Reserve System)
- North California Coast Range Preserve Research Natural Area (Bureau of Land Management)
- Redwood Experimental Forest (United States Forest Service)
- Redwood National Park (National Park Service)
- Redwood State Parks: Del Norte Coast, Jedediah Smith, and Prairie Creek (California Department of Parks and Recreation)
- Western Slopes of Cone Peak (United States Forest Service)

== Protected habitats ==
The constituent components of the California Coast Ranges reserve contain a wide variety of habitats.

The combined Redwood National and State Parks protect 45% of the world's remaining coast redwood (Sequoia sempervirens) old-growth forests.

Angelo Reserve features mixed forests (including mixed evergreen, California bay, tanoak, madrone, upland redwood, upland Douglas-fir, Pacific yew, and knobcone pine); woodlands (including Oregon oak, black oak, interior live oak, and mixed north-slope cismontane); mixed chaparral (including chamise, montane manzanita, whitethorn, tobacco brush, buck brush, interior live oak, and north-slope chaparral); bald hills prairie; grassland; freshwater seep; coastal winter steelhead trout stream; and coastal salmon stream.

Habitats at Big Creek include coastal strand; coastal bluff scrub; coastal scrub; ceanothus shrub; sage scrub; rocky scrubland; chamise chaparral; coast range and streambank woodland; stream-mouth woodland; sycamore-draw woodland; coast live oak forest; mixed hardwood-coast live oak forest; mixed hardwood-canyon live oak forest; Ponderosa pine-Hoover's manzanita woodland; Ponderosa pine-mixed hardwood-coast live oak forest; Ponderosa pine-mixed hardwood-canyon live oak forest; Ponderosa pine-coast live oak forest; coulter pine forest; Santa Lucia-fir woodland; redwood streamside forest; redwood-mixed hardwood forest; pure redwood forest; and aquatic (both freshwater and marine) habitats.

== Sources ==
This article incorporates text from a free content work (license statement/permission). Text taken from UNESCO - MAB Biosphere Reserves Directory, UNESCO, UNESCO.
