= Experimental forest =

Designated forests for research or science studies

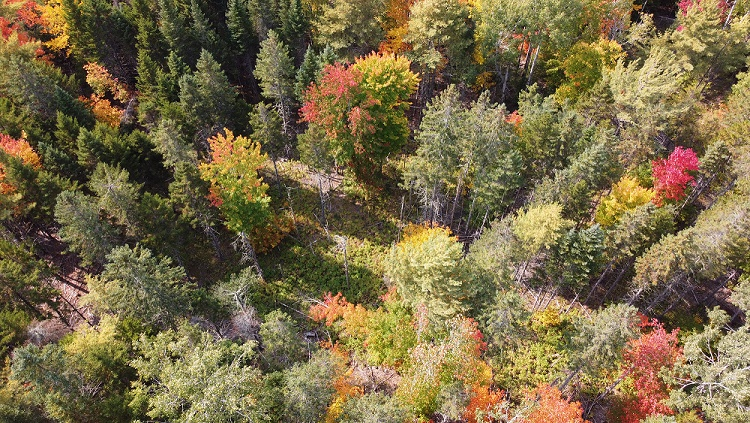
Aerial view of a section of the Penobscot Experimental Forest.

An experimental forest, or experimental range, as defined by the United States Forest Service, is "an area administered ... 'to provide for the research necessary for the management of the land.'"

== Size and relation to other areas ==
According to the USFS, "Most Experimental Forests are large enough to contain significant stream systems and several dozen contain experimental watershed study sites with multiple paired basins." Individual experimental forests range from 0.47 to 225 km^{2} (120 to 55,600 acres) in area. Experimental forests are distinguished from research natural areas and intensive monitoring sites.

== History ==
The present system of 80 experimental forests and ranges began in 1908. Many experimental forest are more than 50 years old. The system provides places for long-term science and management studies in major vegetation types of the 195,000,000 acres (790,000 km^{2}) of public land administered by the Forest Service.

== Experimental forests and ranges in the United States ==
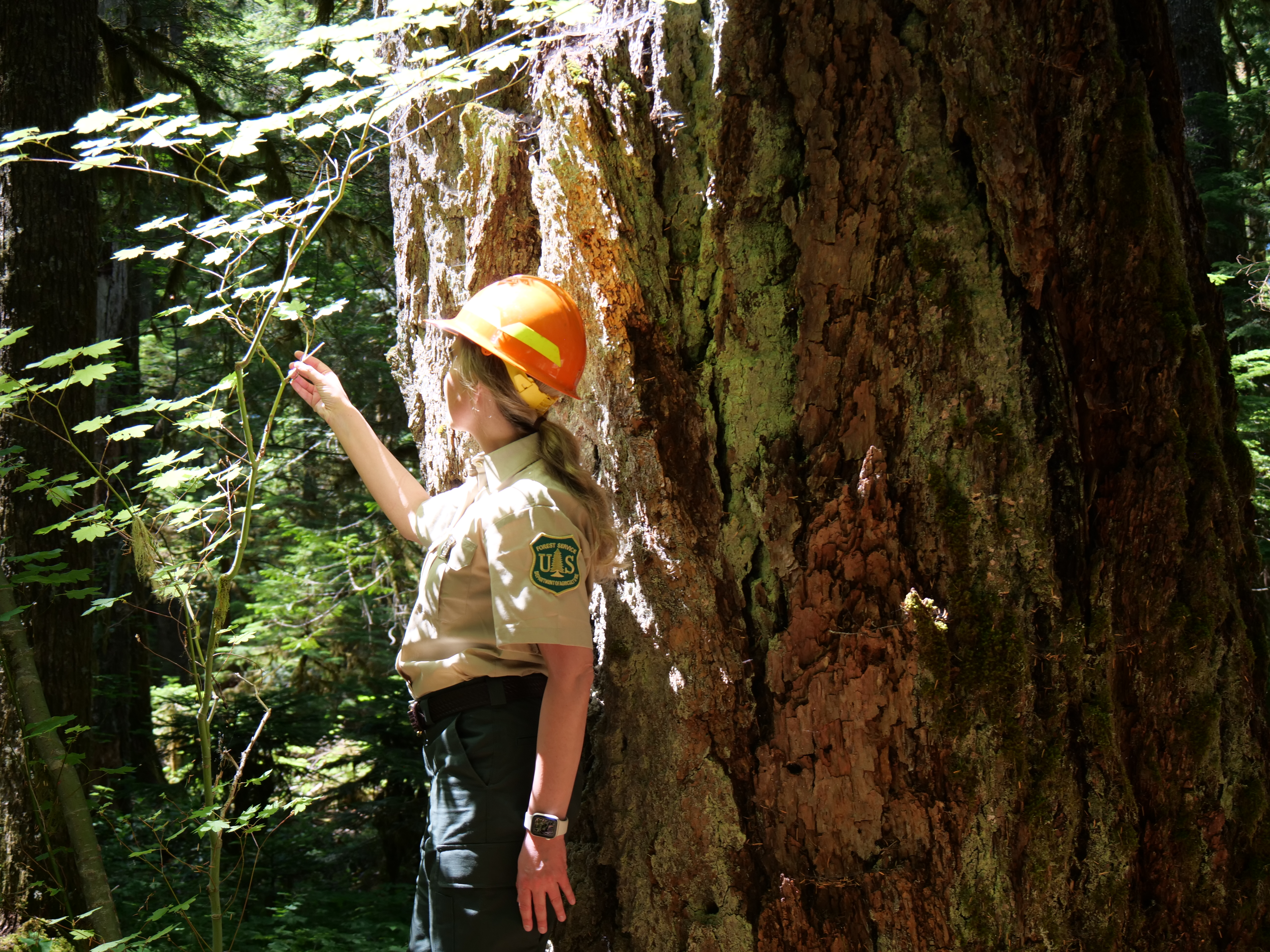
Inside the Wind River Experimental Forest.

- Alum Creek Experimental Forest, Arkansas
- Argonne Experimental Forest, Wisconsin
- Baltimore Long Term Ecological Research, Maryland (cooperating)
- Bartlett Experimental Forest, New Hampshire
- Beaver Creek Experimental Watershed, Arizona
- Bent Creek Experimental Forest, North Carolina
- Big Falls Experimental Forest, Minnesota
- Black Hills Experimental Forest in South Dakota is used to study ponderosa pine timber production, mountain pine beetle, and wildlife habitat.
- Blacks Mountain Experimental Forest, California
- Blue Valley Experimental Forest,
- Boise Basin Experimental Forest in Idaho is used to study old-growth restoration, prescribed fire, and root-system structures.
- Bonanza Creek Experimental Forest, Alaska
- Calhoun Experimental Forest, South Carolina
- Caribou-Poker Creeks Research Watershed, Alaska (cooperating)
- Cascade Head Experimental Forest, Oregon
- Caspar Creek Experimental Watershed, California
- Challenge Experimental Forest, California
- Chipola Experimental Forest, Florida
- Clemson Experimental Forest surrounds the Clemson University campus in South Carolina. The 17,500 acre forest is the largest university forest adjacent to its campus in the country. It is used for research, education, and recreation.
- Crossett Experimental Forest is located in Ashley County, Arkansas.
- Coulee Experimental State Forest, Wisconsin
- Coweeta Hydrologic Laboratory, North Carolina
- Coram Experimental Forest in Montana is used to study western larch, Douglas-fir, forest regeneration, forest growth, silvicultural systems, climate, and hydrology.
- Cutfoot Sioux Experimental Forest, Minnesota
- Deception Creek Experimental Forest in Idaho is used to study sediment movement and transport, forest genetics, root disease, small tree use, and fire effects.
- Delta Experimental Forest, Mississippi
- Denbigh Experimental Forest, North Dakota
- Desert Experimental Range in Utah is used to study cold-desert-plant communities, desertification, sheep management, rodent ecology, pronghorn antelope, soils, and bird and mammal populations.
- Dukes (Upper Peninsula) Experimental Forest, Michigan
- Entiat Experimental Forest, Washington
- Escambia Experimental Forest, Alabama
- Estate Thomas Experimental Forest, U.S. Virgin Islands
- Fernow Experimental Forest, West Virginia
- Fort Valley Experimental Forest in Arizona is used to study forest diseases, forest restoration, wildland–urban interface studies, and fire effects.
- Fraser Experimental Forest is on the western slopes of the Continental Divide in Colorado.
- Glacier Lakes Ecosystem Experiments Site (GLEES) in Wyoming is used to study seedling germination, nitrogen deposits, riparian hydrology, disturbance changes, tree growth, atmospheric pollutants.
- Great Basin Experimental Range in Utah is used to study plant adaptation and ecosystem shifts, nutrient cycling, replanting, restoration ecology, and game habitat.
- H. J. Andrews Experimental Forest, Oregon
- Harrison Experimental Forest, Mississippi
- Hawaii Experimental Tropical Forest, Hawaii
- Héen Latinee, Alaska
- Henry R. Koen Experimental Forest, Arkansas
- Hill Forest, NC State Univ. North Carolina (cooperating)
- Hitchiti Experimental Forest, Georgia
- Howland Cooperating Experimental Forest, Maine (cooperating)
- Hubbard Brook Experimental Forest, New Hampshire
- Kane Experimental Forest, Pennsylvania
- Kaskaskia Experimental Forest, Illinois
- Kings River Experimental Watershed, California
- Long Valley Experimental Forest (Arizona) — ponderosa pine, burning interval effects, tree growth history.
- Lower Peninsula Experimental Forest, Michigan
- Luquillo Experimental Forest, Puerto Rico
- Manitou Experimental Forest (Colorado) — ponderosa pine ecosystems, fire, insect and bird biology, dwarf mistletoe, and wildland-urban interface issues.
- Marcell Experimental Forest located in Chippewa National Forest and 40 km north of Grand Rapids, Minnesota.
- Massabesic Experimental Forest, Maine
- Maybeso Experimental Forest, Alaska
- North Mountain Experimental Area, California
- Olustee Experimental Forest, Florida
- Olympic Experimental State Forest, Washington (cooperating)
- Onion Creek Experimental Forest, California
- Palustris Experimental Forest, Louisiana
- Paoli Experimental Forest, Indiana
- Penobscot Experimental Forest located in Maine is 16.18 km^{2} (4,000 acres) and focuses on silviculture research.
- Pike Bay Experimental Forest, Minnesota
- Priest River Experimental Forest in Idaho is used to study woody debris, soil productivity, acid deposits, seedling development, water yield and quality, and wood decomposition.
- Pringle Falls Experimental Forest, Oregon
- Redwood Experimental Forest is located in Northern California near the mouth of the Klamath River.
- Rhinelander Experimental Forest, Wisconsin
- Sagehen Experimental Forest, California
- San Dimas Experimental Forest in southern California covers 6,945 hectares in the San Gabriel Mountains.
- San Joaquin Experimental Range is in the foothills of the Sierra Nevada in California.
- Santa Rita Experimental Range is located in southern Arizona and is the oldest experimental range in the United States.
- Santee Experimental Forest, South Carolina
- Scull Shoals Experimental Forest, Georgia
- Sierra Ancha Experimental Forest in Arizona is used for long-term hydrologic studies.
- Silas Little Experimental Forest, New Jersey
- Sinkin Experimental Forest, Missouri
- South Umpqua Experimental Forest, Oregon
- Stanislaus-Tuolumne Experimental Forest is in the central Sierra Nevada in California.
- Starkey Experimental Forest and Range, Oregon
- Stephen F. Austin Experimental Forest, Texas
- Swain Mountain Experimental Forest, California
- Sylamore Experimental Forest, Arkansas
- Tallahatchie Experimental Forest, Mississippi
- Teakettle Experimental Forest, California
- Tenderfoot Creek Experimental Forest in Montana is used to study hydrology, climate, and regenerating and restoring lodgepole pine.
- Udell Experimental Forest, Michigan
- Vinton Furnace Experimental Forest, Ohio
- Wind River Experimental Forest, Washington
- Young Bay Experimental Forest, Alaska

== See also ==
- List of types of formally designated forests
