= Maybeso Experimental Forest =

Experimental forest in Southeast Alaska

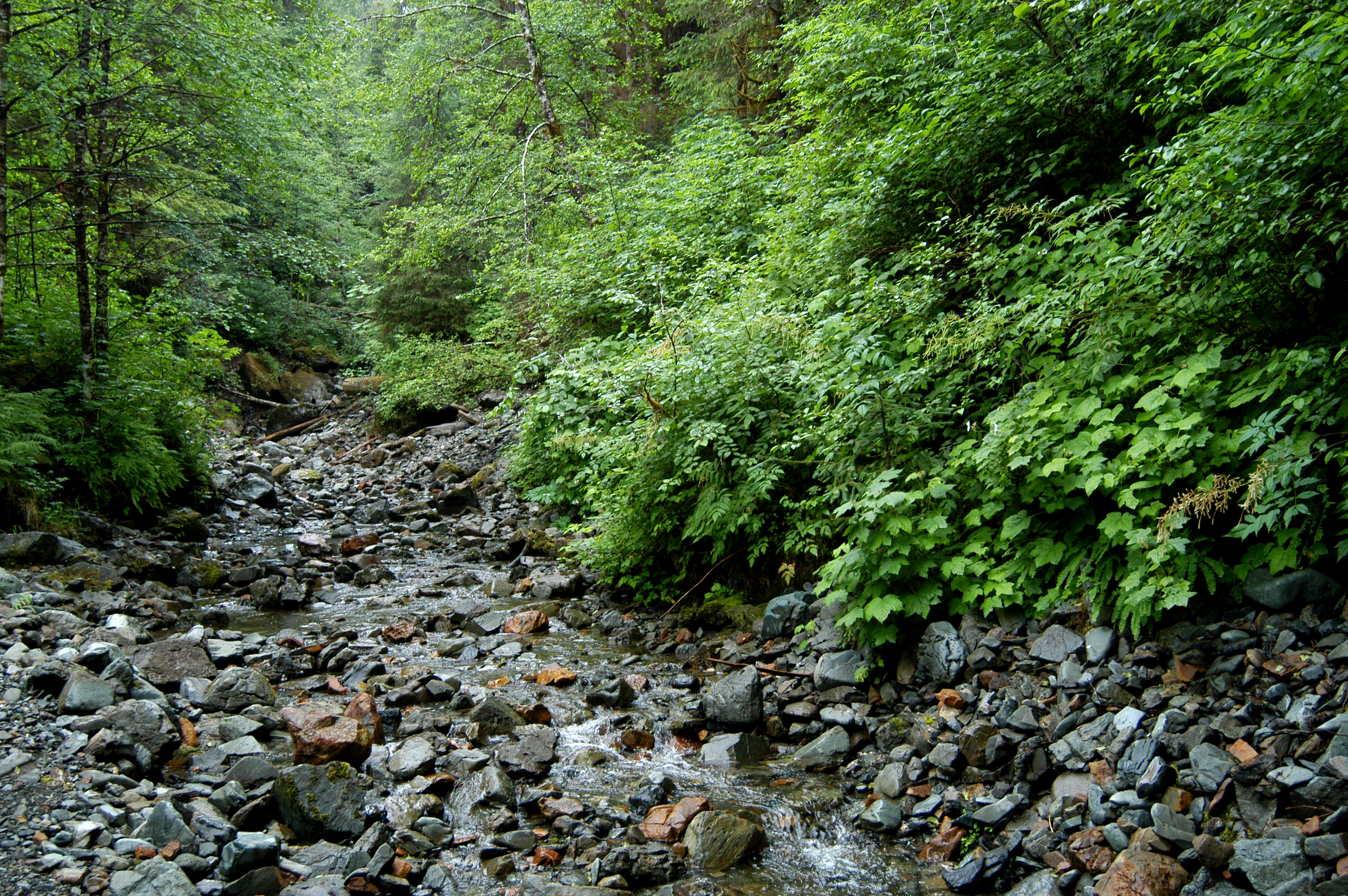
Maybeso Creek

The Maybeso Experimental Forest is an experimental forest on Prince of Wales Island in Alaska. It is near Hollis, Alaska in the Tongass National Forest and is administered by the United States Forest Service. The area of the forest is approximately 1,101 acres (446 ha), with a peak elevation of 2,953 feet (900 m). The forest was established in 1956 to examine the effects of large-scale clearcut timber harvesting on forest regeneration and anadromous salmonid spawning areas. The Maybeso Experimental Forest is the site of the first large-scale clearcut logging operation in Southeast Alaska, and nearly all commercial forest was removed from the area between 1953 and 1960. Presently, the forest is an even-aged, second-growth Sitka spruce and Western hemlock forest.

== History ==
The Maybeso Experimental Forest was established in 1956 within the Maybeso watershed near Hollis, Alaska, which is about 42 miles (68 km) west of Ketchikan, Alaska. The purpose of the Maybeso Experimental Forest is to investigate the effects of industrial clearcut logging on forest regeneration, tree growth, and salmon streams, and it was the site of the first large-scale clearcut timber harvest in Southeast Alaska. Since the establishment of the Maybeso Experimental Forest, researchers have focused on the effects of clearcut timber harvest on the surrounding watershed, regeneration of managed forest, landslides and slope stability, and soil movement.

Prince of Wales Island has had a human presence for approximately 10,000 years. The island is home to various groups of Alaska Natives, and the Maybeso watershed was historically used by the Kaigani Haida. After European and American miners arrived in the area in the early 1900s, the population of the region expanded rapidly after the emergence of logging in the 1950s.

== Climate ==
The Maybeso Experimental Forest is within the broader Tongass National Forest, and is characterized by having a temperate, perhumid climate. Temperatures are moderated by the influence of the nearby Pacific Ocean which infiltrates the Alexander Archipelago, and range from 10.4 to 69.8 °F (−12.0 to 21.0 °C) throughout the year. The mean annual temperature is 44.1 °F (6.7 °C). The region is also notable for having consistent precipitation throughout the year, and the average annual rainfall within the Maybeso Experimental Forest is about 108 inches (2,700 mm). Peak rainfall occurs in April and May, and October and November.

Red alder (Alnus rubra), the most common deciduous tree in the watershed, is more common in the Maybeso Experimental Forest when compared to other regions of the Tongass National Forest. Red alder uses disturbed soil more efficiently than other local flora, and benefits from the logging activity and landslides that have disrupted the soils of the forest. Red alder is a shade-intolerant species, and the aforementioned events create canopy gaps that red alder can take advantage of.

Major disturbances that pose a threat to the Maybeso Experimental Forest are windthrow and landslides. In particular, the threat of landslides has increased dramatically since the initial clearcut of the forest. Due to the perhumid climate of the region, wildfire is generally not a significant threat to forests within the Tongass National Forest.

== Fauna ==
Notable fauna include:

- Pink salmon (Oncorhyncus gorbuscha)
- Chum salmon (Oncorhyncus keta)
- Coho salmon (Oncorhyncus kisutch)
- Steelhead (Oncorhyncus mykiss)
- Cutthroat trout (Oncorhyncus clarkii)
- Dolly Varden trout (Salvelinus malma)
- Sitka black-tailed deer (Odocoileus hemionus sitkensis)
- Black bear (Ursus americanus)
- North American beaver (Castor canadensis)
- American marten (Martes americana)
- American ermine (Mustela richardsonii)
- Bald eagle (Haliaeetus leucocephalus)
- Northern goshawk (Accipiter gentilis)

== Flora ==
Notable flora include:

- Sitka spruce (Picea sitchensis)
- Western hemlock (Tsuga heterophylla)
- Red alder (Alnus rubra)
- Mountain hemlock (Tsuga mertensiana)
- Alaska yellow cedar (Callitropsis nootkatensis)
- Western redcedar (Thuja plicata)
- Sitka alder (Alnus alnobetula)
- Devil's club (Oplopanax horridus)
- Stink currant (Ribes bracteosum)

== Research ==
The Maybeso Experimental Forest is a landmark site for research purposes because it was the location of the first large-scale clearcut operation in Southeast Alaska. Most studies regarding forest management and silviculture are still ongoing, and are expected to be completed by 2074. However, initial findings suggest that while forest regeneration has been generally healthy, the structure of the second-growth forest is "far from uniform."

Most research conducted thus far has focused on the effects of clearcutting on anadromous salmonid spawning habitat. Pink salmon, chum salmon, coho salmon, steelhead, cutthroat trout, and Dolly Varden trout all spawn within the Maybeso watershed. Clearcutting has had significant effects on salmonid spawning habitat due to the influx of large woody debris in various habitats. Large-scale logging operations have increased the amount of large woody debris, and clearcutting has also increased the scale and frequency of landslides, which further increases the amount of woody debris. Without large trees in the riparian zone, large woody debris is unimpeded in entering the streams within the watershed, and studies show that "half of the LWD in clear-cut channels was recruited during and immediately after logging."

This influx of large woody debris within stream channels greatly influences the formation of step structures, which are critical features of salmonid spawning habitats. Studies show that "landslides and debris flows are the dominant channel-altering processes in headwater streams and remove the step profile," and increases in channel disturbance events can have long-term consequences throughout a watershed.

Large woody debris is also linked with healthier benthic invertebrates within a watershed. Previously logged areas have been linked to benthos with "increased richness, densities and biomass relative to old growth types," and maintaining a source of woody debris as well as red alder within a clearcut riparian zone leads to healthier benthic invertebrates in the long-term.

Ultimately, the Maybeso Experimental Forest is a landmark site of scientific research on the effects of clearcutting on an old-growth forest. The significance of the effects of clearcutting on local flora and fauna is controversial, with differing interpretations of the findings of past and present research. However, it is evident that clearcutting has significantly altered the structure and function of the Maybeso watershed. More research is required to draw broader conclusions.
