= Angelo Coast Range Reserve =

Nature reserve in California, US

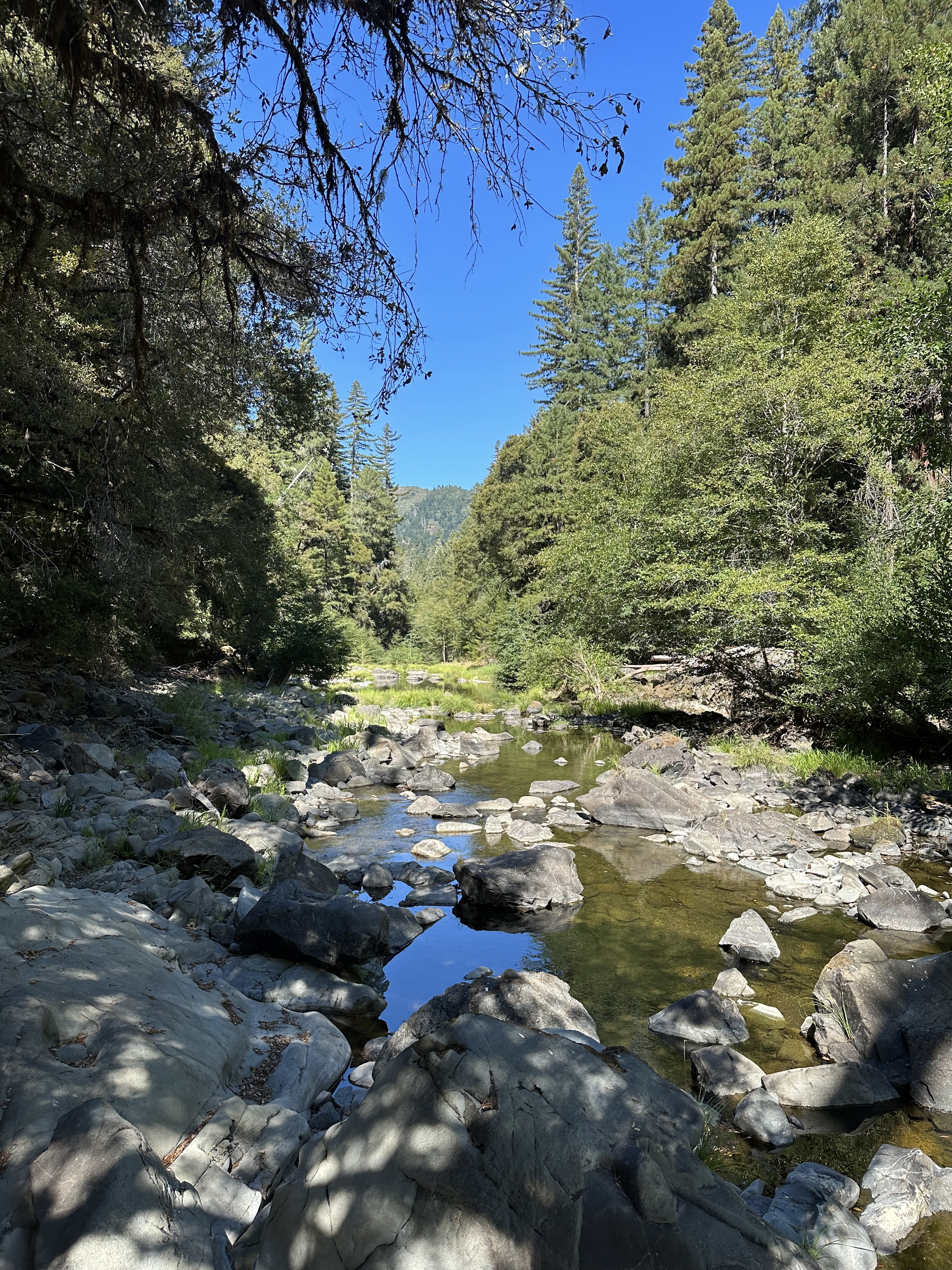
- South Fork Eel River near Horseshoe Bend within Angelo Coast Range Reserve

- Location within California Location within the United States
- Location: Mendocino County, California
- Coordinates: 39°43′45″N 123°38′40″W
- Area: 8,051 acres (12.580 mi^{2})
- Governing body: University of California, Berkeley
- Website: https://angelo.berkeley.edu/

The Angelo Coast Range Reserve is located in the Northern Outer California Coast Ranges, in Mendocino County, Northern California. As part of the University of California Natural Reserve System, the mission of the Angelo Reserve is to provide protected natural areas for research and education.

== Geographic context ==
The rugged 20-square-kilometer (7.7-square-mile) reserve includes a section of the Eel River and a portion of Elder Creek, a National Natural Landmarks. Elevation ranges from 378 to 1,290 meters (1,240 to 4,232 feet) above sea level. Annual rainfall is highly variable with an average of 215.6 centimetres (84.9 inches).

== Research ==
The Angelo Coast Range Reserve provides a unique setting for studies of rivers, forests, meadows, and landscape evolution along California's North Coast. Fundamental natural processes are clearer in places that have not been destabilized by multiple disturbances. Many important questions can not be addressed without long-term research, and long-term research cannot be maintained without protected research sites. Major research projects such as the Eel River Critical Zone Observatory have been hosted by the reserve.

== History ==
Heath and Marjorie Angelo bought the property in 1931 and sold the land to The Nature Conservancy in 1959. In 1989, an agreement with the University of California incorporated the property into the University of California Natural Reserve System. The reserve is administered by the Vice Chancellor for Research Office at University of California, Berkeley. The Angelo Reserve was designated part of the California Coast Ranges International Biosphere Reserve from 1983 to 2017.

== Habitat ==
Habitats in the reserve include mixed forests (including mixed evergreen, California bay, tanoak, madrone, upland redwood, upland Douglas-fir, Pacific yew, and knobcone pine); woodlands (including Oregon oak, black oak, interior live oak, and mixed north-slope cismontane); mixed chaparral (including chamise, montane manzanita, whitethorn, ceanothus, buck brush, interior live oak, and north-slope chaparral); bald hills prairie; grassland; mainstem and tributary river channels draining from 0.4 to 327 square kilometers (0.15 - 126 square miles).

== See also ==
- Angelo Reserve Website
- Natural history of the California Coast Ranges
