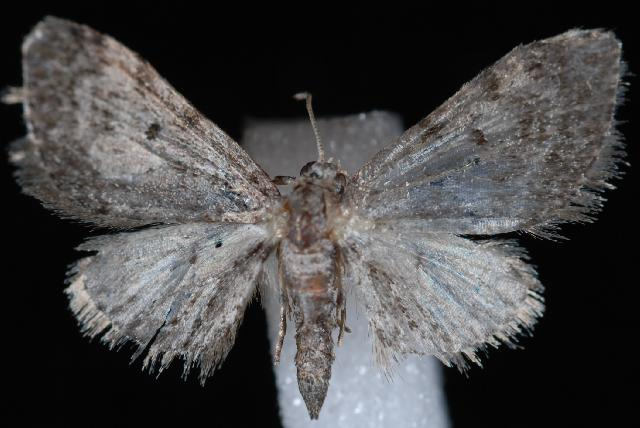

Scientific classification
- Kingdom: Animalia
- Phylum: Arthropoda
- Class: Insecta
- Order: Lepidoptera
- Family: Geometridae
- Genus: Eupithecia
- Species: E. misturata

Binomial name
- Eupithecia misturata (Hulst, 1896)

Synonyms
- Tephroclystia misturata Hulst, 1896; Eupithecia conformata Pearsall, 1908; Eupithecia frostiata Swett, 1907; Eupithecia harveyata Taylor, 1906; Eupithecia insignificata Taylor, 1906; Eupithecia minorata Taylor, 1907; Eupithecia scelestata Taylor, 1907; Tephroclystia subfoveata Dyar, 1904; Eupithecia sublineata Taylor, 1906

= Eupithecia misturata =

Species of moth

Eupithecia misturata is a moth in the family Geometridae first described by George Duryea Hulst in 1896. It is widely distributed in western North America.

The wingspan is about 16–18 mm. flowering trees and shrubs, including Holodiscus discolor, Ceanothus velutinus, Arctostaphylos and Quercus species.

== Subspecies ==
- Eupithecia misturata misturata (from southern California north to British Columbia and southern Alberta and east to the Rocky Mountains of Colorado, Utah and New Mexico)
- Eupithecia misturata delzurata Cassino & Swett 1922 (California)
