= Caloptilia ribesella =

Scientific classification
- Kingdom: Animalia
- Phylum: Arthropoda
- Clade: Pancrustacea
- Class: Insecta
- Order: Lepidoptera
- Family: Gracillariidae
- Genus: Caloptilia
- Species: C. ribesella

Binomial name
- Caloptilia ribesella (Chambers, 1877)

Species of moth

Caloptilia ribesella is a moth of the family Gracillariidae. It is known from Colorado and Washington in the United States.

The larvae feed on Ribes species, including Ribes bracteosum. They mine the leaves of their host plant.
