= Redwood Experimental Forest =

Experimental forest in Del Norte County, California

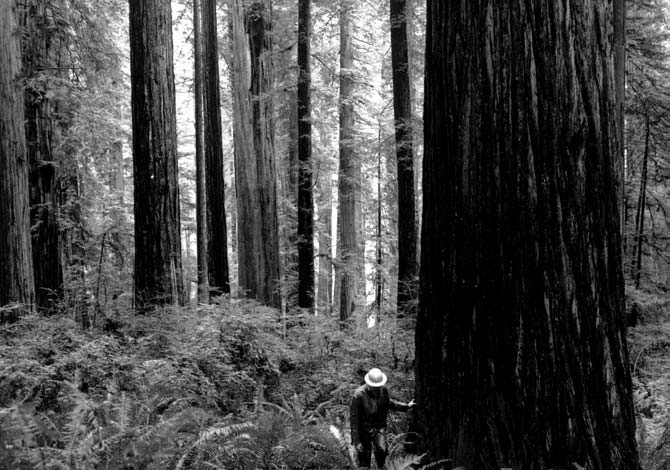
- Redwoods and lush understory in the Yurok Research Natural Area, part of the Redwood Experimental Forest, ca. 1976

- Location within California
- Location: Del Norte County, California, USA
- Nearest town: Klamath, California, USA
- Coordinates: 41°35′N 124°5′W
- Area: 379 hectares (940 acres; 1.46 mi^{2})
- Governing body: United States Forest Service

The Redwood Experimental Forest (also Yurok Redwood Experimental Forest, formerly Yurok Experimental Forest) (established 1940) is an experimental forest in Del Norte County, California. The forest is near the mouth of the Klamath River in the California Coast Ranges of Northern California. The 3.8-square-kilometer (1.46-square-mile) forest is drained by High Prairie Creek. As its name implies, the principal species in the forest is coast redwood (Sequoia sempervirens), but the site also contains Douglas fir, Sitka spruce, western hemlock, and Port Orford cedar. The forest is managed by the United States Forest Service. Tree ages range up to 1,200 years. Topography varies considerably over the forest. Slopes range from 0 to over 75%, and elevation ranges from 40 to 340 m (130–1,120 ft).

About 45% of the total area was clearcut between 1956 and 1985. About 1 percent was harvested in 1981 using the selection system. An additional 23% is available for approved manipulative research studies, and 16 percent is preserved in an undisturbed old-growth redwood forest condition in the Yurok Research Natural Area (RNA) established in 1976.

The Redwood Experimental Forest was designated part of the California Coast Ranges International Biosphere Reserve in 1983.

== Climate ==
The climate at the Redwood is typically mild and foggy in summer. The average July temperature is 12.6 °C (54.7 °F), with little precipitation other than fog drip. The average January temperature is 6.8 °C (44.2 °F). Annual rainfall averages 1,930 millimetres (76 in) and snowfall is uncommon. Precipitation is well in excess of potential evapotranspiration, except for about a month in midsummer.

== Geology ==
The entire region is underlain by Mesozoic rocks of the Franciscan formation, a complex of raw to slightly metamorphic sedimentary rocks. This formation is generally soft and easily weathered, so that soil development is good, with unweathered regolith at depths of about 3 metres (9.8 ft) in most areas. Rock outcrops are few, and where they do occur, shallow soils and exposure combine to make such sites ecologically unique.
