= Stanislaus-Tuolumne Experimental Forest =

Biosphere reserve in the Sierra Nevada, California

- Stanislaus-Tuolumne Biosphere Reserve
- Location within California Location within the United States
- Location: Central Sierra Nevada, California, USA
- Nearest town: Pinecrest, Tuolumne County, California
- Coordinates: 38°3′N 119°57′W
- Area: 607 hectares (1,500 acres)
- Established: 1976
- Governing body: Stanislaus-Tuolumne Experimental Forest, United States Forest Service

The Stanislaus-Tuolumne Experimental Forest is an experimental forest under the management of the United States Forest Service. It was a UNESCO Biosphere Reserve established 1976 and withdrawn in 2017. Stanislaus-Tuolumne is located on the western slopes of the central Sierra Nevada mountains near Pinecrest, California about 15 kilometres (9.3 mi) northwest of Yosemite National Park.

== History ==
This 607 hectares (1,500 acres) experimental forest is significant for its long history of timber management research. The Stanislaus-Tuolumne was designated a United States Forest Service experimental forest in December 1943, though research in the area had been ongoing since the 1920s. The effort to create the Stanislaus-Tuolumne was driven by Duncan Dunning, who had been pushing for formal designation of an experimental forest on the Stanislaus National Forest since the early 1930s. The forest consists of two tracts: the 156 hectares (390 acres) Stanislaus Tract on the South Fork of the Stanislaus River and the 534 hectares (1,320 acres) Tuolumne Tract on the lower slopes of Dodge Ridge, just south of the North Fork of the Tuolumne River. Elevations range from 1,590 to 1,950 metres (5,220 to 6,400 ft). The site was designated as a UNESCO biosphere reserve in 1976 and was one of 17 sites withdrawn from the programme in June 2017.

== Ecology ==
Dominating trees in the area are ponderosa pine (Pinus ponderosa) and sugar pine (P. lambertiana). Early research included studies on reproduction, planting, pruning, slash disposal and lumber recovery. More recent studies have involved climate, insects, mistletoe, harvest cuttings, site preparation, herbicides and roots. Trees in one tract have been inventoried by stand-conditions classes within one hectare divisions, providing an excellent data base. Several plantations, areas of natural young-growth, and large blocks of diverse species and age classes which are virtually uncut, provide great potential for silvicultural and ecological research in a complex forest system.

== Sources ==
This article incorporates text from a free content work (license statement/permission). Text taken from UNESCO - MAB Biosphere Reserves Directory, UNESCO, UNESCO.
