= Cyrus Sutton =

American director

- Born: 1982 (age 43–44); San Diego, California, United States
- Occupation: Film director

Cyrus Sutton (born 1982) is an American director and professional surfer. Growing up in Southern California and dividing his time between the coast and mountains, Sutton's inventive approach to filmmaking became the basis of the outdoor surf website Korduroy.tv Growing up near the ocean and participating in water sports such as body surfing, bodyboarding and surfing, he sought to use cinematography to document the surf culture around him and on his travels. His commercial clients include Adidas, Apple, Corona, Reef, and Patagonia. His career has been well documented by various national publications such as Surfer Magazine and The New York Times.

== Education ==
Before graduating Los Alamitos High School in 2000, Sutton lived in Japan with his father where he received his middle school education while attending Fukuoka International School, Fukuoka, Japan.

== Career ==
- 1999–2002 – Professional surfer until age twenty and again in 2007 at age twenty-five. He is still presently surfing professionally, earning the cover of The Surfer's Journal in 2011.
- 2002–2003 – Editor and writer at Opper Sports Productions
- 2006–2008 – In-house multimedia consultant at Ubiquity Records
- 2009–2010 – Director for Landia Productions
- 2009–Present; Sutton created Korduroy Productions and serves as the company's founder and creative director.
- 2011–present – Brand ambassador for Reef
- 2013–present – Brand ambassador for Leatherman

== Films ==
- (2003) Riding Waves ASIN B002DVPKDG – Sutton's first film, covering then surfer amateur Dane Reynolds in 2003 when Cyrus was only 19 years old.
- (2005) Next Wave: A Tsunami Relief Story The Pacific Southwest Region of the National Academy of Television Arts & Sciences awarded an EMMY® to "The Next Wave, a tsunami relief story for Best Topical Documentary.
- (2005) Under the Sun ASIN B0063F8E90 – A 16mm documentary film featuring surfing from Dave Rastovich, Beau Young, Nat Young. Filmed in Australia's Byron Bay and Gold Coast, Under the Sun depicts the roots of commercialism in the surfing culture.
- (2009) Tom's Creation Plantation A Peels Production: ASIN B003IGMFU6 – Paying homage to the original surfers this film explores surfing on an alaia and also includes a tutorial on how to shape your own finless surfboard alaia.
- (2011) Stoked and Broke – A San Diego staycation of sorts this surfari epic was filmed on a zero budget as Cyrus Sutton and Ryan Burch make their own surfboards, solar cookers and hobo stoves and head off on a thirty-mile, eight-day adventure through San Diego, Ca.
- (2013) Compassing Cyrus Sutton embarks on a surfing adventure through the western side of North America as he customizes his van into a unique camper for his journey on the road.
- (2013) Homeland Homeland is a short film about the Basque Country surfing culture and the Basque people.
- (2012) Another Day in the Life of Wayne Lynch This film follows Australian Hall of Fame Surfer Wayne Lynch and takes a look back at his surfing career and contributions to the shortboard.

== Awards and accolades ==
- 2003 – Best Cinematography at X-Dance Film Fest for Riding Waves
- 2005 – Emmy Award Best Southwest Region Documentary for Next Wave: A Tsunami Relief Story
- 2009 – Best Short Film at Yallingup Surf Film Fest for Tom's Creation Plantation
- 2010 – Best Story X-Dance Film Fest, Best Film Canadian Surf Film Fest, Best Film Anglet Surf Film Fest, Best Film Surfilm Festival San Sebastián, Best Film London Surf Film Fest for Stoked and Broke
- 2012 – Best Short Film, San Diego Surf Film Fest Another Day in the Life of Wayne Lynch

== Sponsors ==
- Reef
- Leatherman
- GoPro
- Beaming
