= Del Norte Coast Redwoods State Park =

State park in California, USA

- IUCN category II (national park)
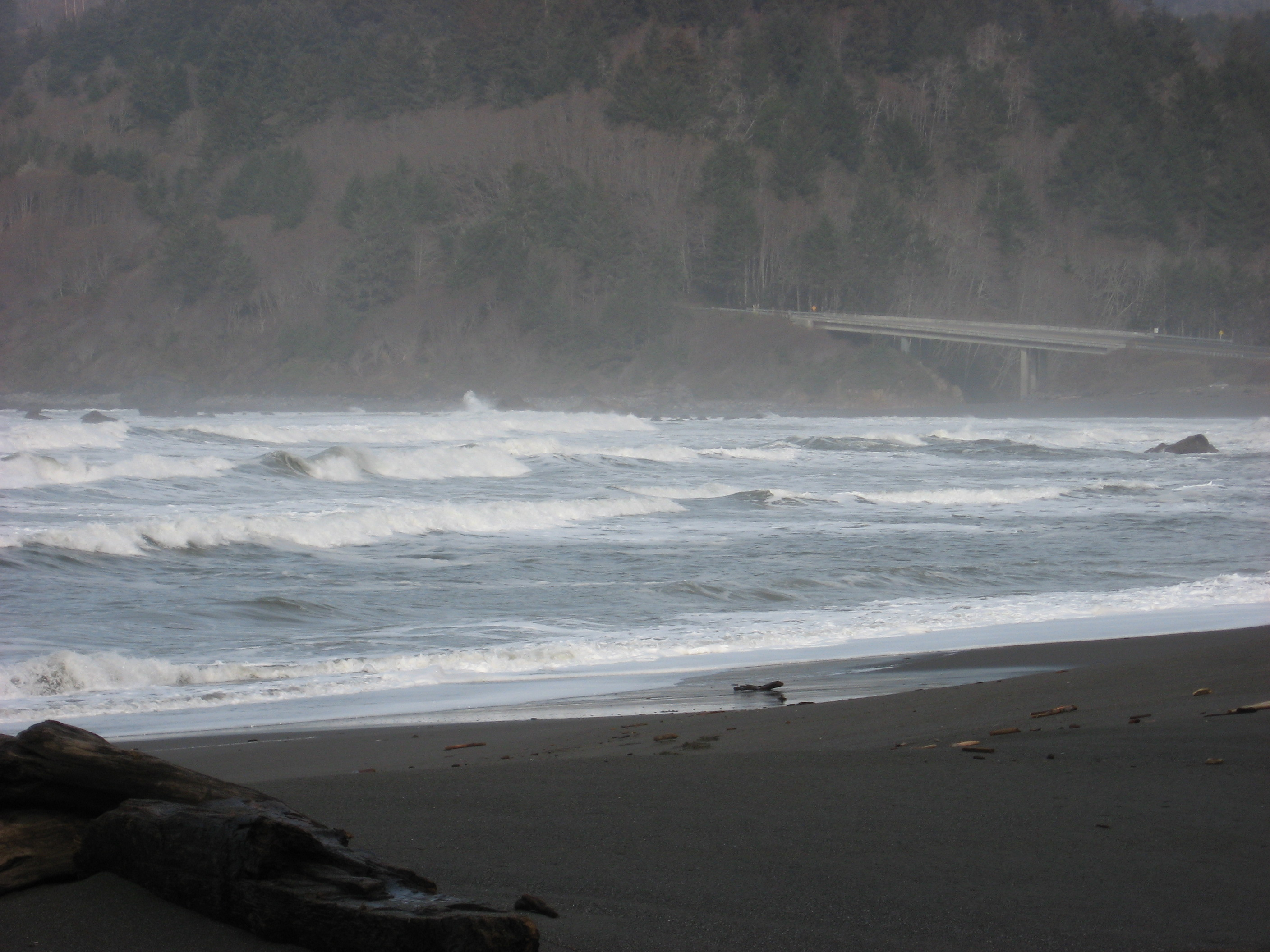

- Location within California Location within the United States
- Interactive map of Del Norte Coast Redwoods State Park
- Location: Del Norte County, California, United States
- Nearest city: Crescent City, California
- Coordinates: 41°40′15″N 124°7′2″W
- Area: 31,261 acres (48.845 mi^{2}; 126.51 km^{2})
- Established: 1925
- Governing body: California Department of Parks and Recreation, National Park Service

Del Norte Coast Redwoods State Park is a state park of California, United States, and a component of the Redwood National and State Parks. The park is about half old-growth forest of coast redwoods and includes 8 miles (13 km) of wild Pacific coastline. The park was significantly expanded in 2002 with the 39 mi^{2} (100 km^{2}) Mill Creek Addition. Originally established in 1925, the park is now 126.5 km^{2} (48.8 sq mi). The park was designated part of the California Coast Ranges International Biosphere Reserve in 1983.

== Proposals for closure ==
A proposal to close a portion of this park placed it on the list of 48 California state parks proposed for closure in January 2008 by Governor Arnold Schwarzenegger as part of a deficit reduction program. The decision was rescinded following public outcry. However, in May 2011 the park was one of 70 state parks threatened with closure. In October 2011 the National Park Service agreed to provisionally take over management of Del Norte Coast Redwoods for one year.

== See also ==
- List of California state parks
- Mill Creek, Del Norte, California
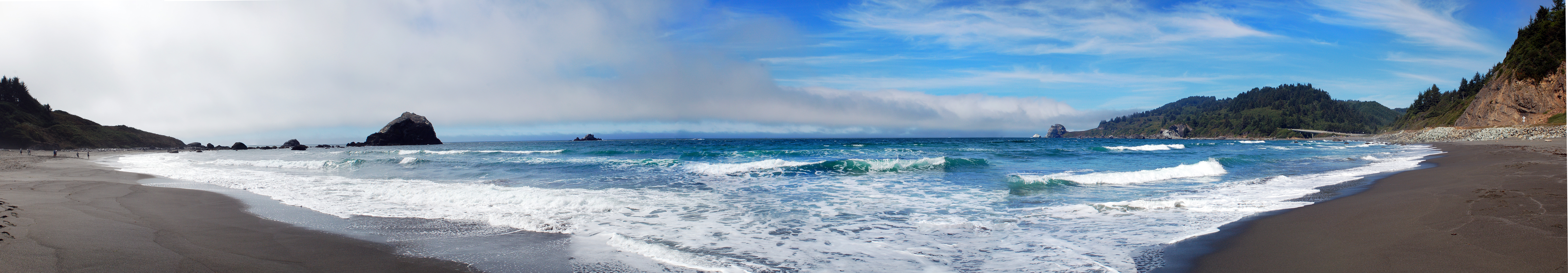
180° panorama from the Wilson Creek Beach, Del Norte Coast Redwoods State Park on an early-September afternoon. On the right, HWY 101 crosses Wilson Creek via bridge. Offshore appear Wilson and False-Klamath Rocks
