= Penobscot Experimental Forest =

Experimental forest in Bradley and Eddington, Maine, United States

Coordinates: 44°51′00″N 68°37′20″W

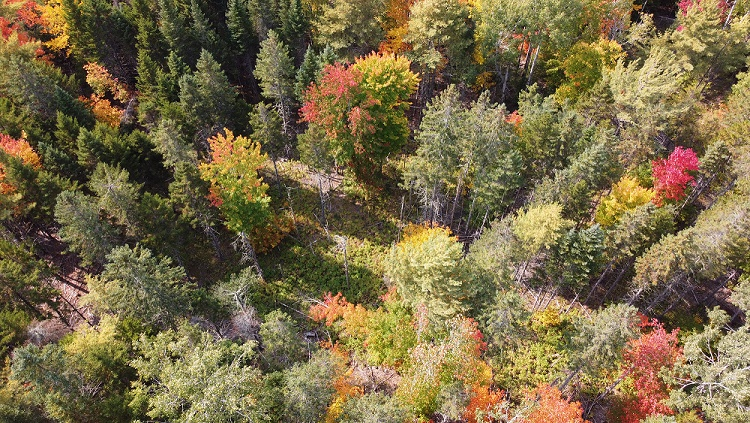
Above the Penobscot Experimental Forest.

The Penobscot Experimental Forest (PEF) is an Experimental Forest managed by the US Forest Service (USFS) in the towns of Bradley and Eddington, in the US state of Maine. The mission of the PEF is to afford a setting for long-term research conducted cooperatively by USDA Forest Service scientists, university researchers, and professional forest managers in Maine; to enhance forestry education of students and the public; and to demonstrate how the timber needs of society are met from a working forest.

The forests that encompasses the PEF today were originally purchased by nine pulp, paper, and land-holding companies in 1950 and was leased to the USFS Northeastern Forest Experiment Station as a site for long-term forest management and research. In 1994, the PEF was donated to the University of Maine. Since then the PEF has been jointly managed by the University of Maine and the USFS.

The primary research experiment at the PEF has been a long-term silviculture experiment, which contains a replicated treatments from a range of even-age and uneven-age silvicultural prescriptions, including clearcut, shelterwood, selection, diameter-limit, and unmanaged silvicultural treatments.
