= Teakettle Experimental Forest =

Research forest in California, United States

- Location within the United States

Geography
- Location: Shaver Lake, California, United States
- Coordinates: 36°58′00″N 119°01′00″W
- Elevation: 2,000 to 2,800 m (6,600 to 9,200 ft)
- Area: 1,300 ha (3,200 acres)

Administration
- Authority: University of California, Davis
- Website: teakettle.ucdavis.edu

The Teakettle Experimental Forest is an experimental forest, part of the Sierra National Forest that is set aside for research into forest ecology. The forest is located 80 kilometres (50 mi) east of Fresno, California, between Yosemite and Kings Canyon National Parks. The area is old-growth forest at 2,000 to 2,800 metres (6,600 to 9,200 ft) elevation and consists primarily of mixed-conifer and red fir forest common on the western slope of the Sierra Nevada.

The forest was established in the 1930s when California state and federal agencies began exploring how the Central Valley of California's water supply might be increased through management of Sierra Nevada watersheds. In 1938, a 1,300 hectares (3,200 acres) area surrounding Teakettle Creek was designated the Teakettle Experimental Area and five drainages were chosen for study. Stream gauge stations and sediment basins were built in the 1940s. Research collaborators have come from the following institutions and agencies: California State University, Michigan Technological University, National Aeronautics and Space Administration-Goddard Space Flight Center, Oregon State University, University of California, University of Maryland, Virginia Commonwealth University, Universidad Metropolitana, University of Michigan, University of Nevada, University of Washington, USDA Forest Service, Forest Inventory and Analysis Program, Sierra National Forest, and Southern Research Station. There is a bunkhouse cabin, dry laboratory, and storage garage. The experimental forest is gated and relatively remote.

From about 1995 to 2025, researchers used the forest to study the effects of forest thinning and prescribed burns on forest health.

Researchers had planned a prescribed burn across the entire experimental forest area to study the effects of a larger prescribed burn, funded by a $5 million grant from the California Department of Forestry and Fire Protection. The Garnet Fire, which started on August 24, 2025, killed most trees and sterilized the ground, halting all research. It is unlikely that the forest will rebound without significant intervention.
