= Marcell Experimental Forest =

Ecosystem research site near Grand Rapids, Minnesota

Coordinates: 47°30′23″N 93°27′20″W

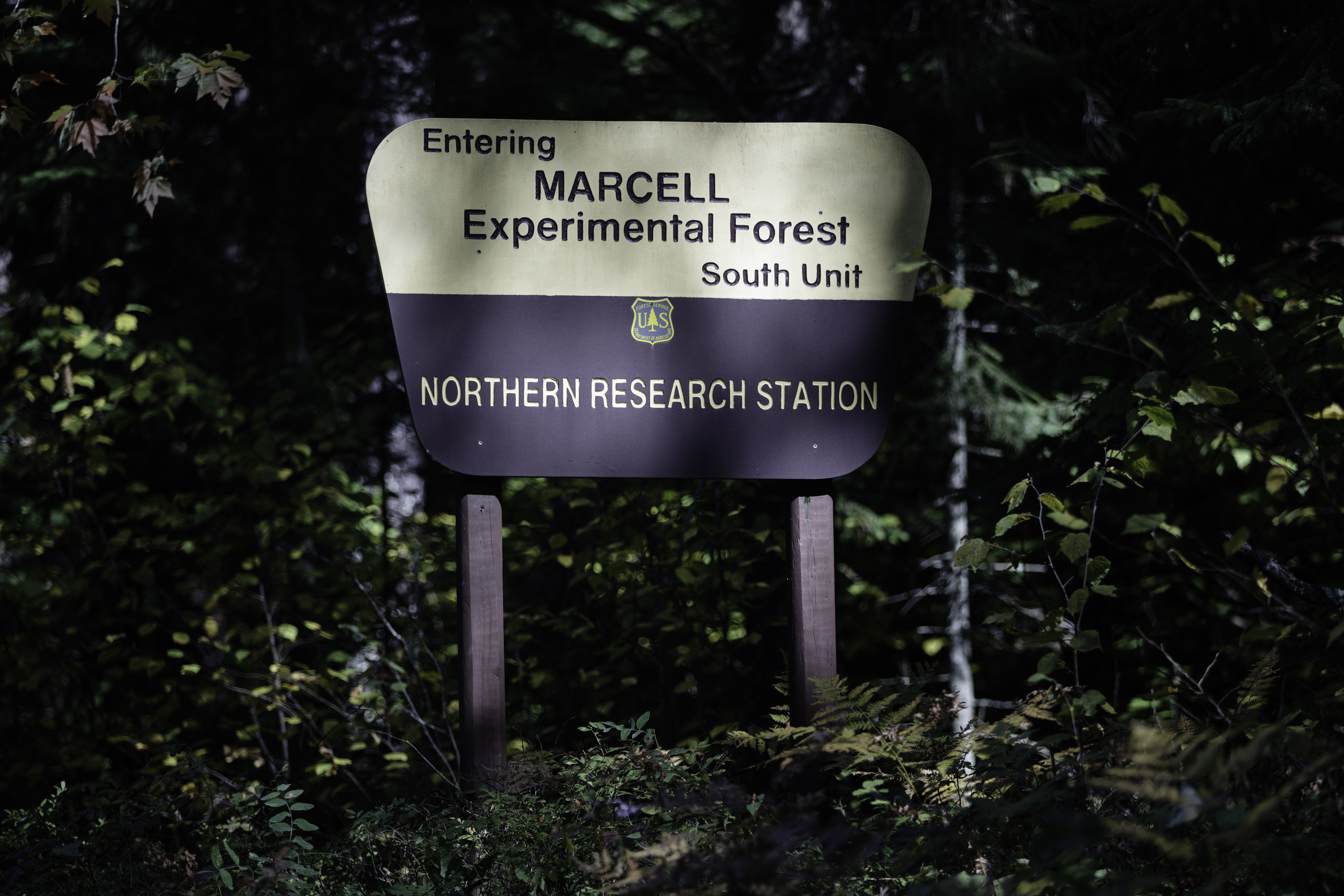
Entrance sign to the South Unit.

Marcell Experimental Forest (MEF) is a 1,140 ha long-term ecosystem research site operated by the Northern Research Station of the U.S. Forest Service. It is located 40 km north of Grand Rapids, Minnesota within the Chippewa National Forest and was formally established in 1962 to study the ecology and hydrology of peatland watersheds. There are six experimental watersheds each of which consist of an upland portion, a peatland, and an outlet stream. The range of these six watersheds provide a variety of hydrological environments to study. Climatic and hydrologic data have been continuously monitored since 1961. Some notable research areas have been hydrology, nutrient and mercury cycling and behavior, and release of organic carbon and acidity.

MEF is the longest running National Atmospheric Deposition Program (NADP) site in the nation.

== Climate and physical characteristics ==
Peatlands and lakes comprise 30% of the forest landscape at the MEF. The peatlands include fens and bogs. The peatlands may be treeless or have tree cover and the forested bogs contain black spruce and tamarack. Both forested and open bogs are dominated by Sphagnum and ericaceous shrubs. Fens also include northern white cedar and black ash.

The climate is subhumid continental with moist warm summers and relatively dry, cold, and sunny winters including large diurnal and seasonal temperature fluctuations. The extreme low temperature is -50.8 °F, extreme high temperature is 100.4 °F, and the average annual air temperature is 38.1 °F. The average temperature at MEF has risen about 0.72 °F per decade since the 1960s.

Mean annual precipitation is 30.4 inches with 75% occurring in the snow-free period.

The pH of waters in the bogs range from about 3.5 to 4.5 with the fens having a pH of near neutral.

== Facilities ==
The Marcell Research Center has a heated shop, laboratory, conference facility and living quarters for up to eight visiting researchers and graduate students.

Spruce and Peatland Responses Under Changing Environments (SPRUCE) project is located within MEF and is a climate change manipulation study. This is a 10+ year, large scale Department of Energy sponsored experiment that is a collaboration between the US Forest Service Northern Research Station and Oak Ridge National Laboratory and involves 100+ scientists from around the world. Large chambers have been built to test the effect of elevated temperature and elevated carbon dioxide on bog vegetation and carbon dynamics.
