= Denbigh Experimental Forest =

Arboretum and experimental forest in North Dakota

Coordinates: 48°17′26″N 100°38′12″W

- Interactive map of Denbigh Experimental Forest
- Type: Arboretum, Experimental forest
- Nearest city: Towner, North Dakota
- Area: 636 acres (257 ha)

The Denbigh Experimental Forest 636 acres (257 ha) is an arboretum and experimental forest operated by the Forest Service of the U.S. Department of Agriculture. It is located 15 miles (24 km) west of Towner, North Dakota.

The forest contains about 30 species of woody plants, labeled and planted in a park-like setting, including Scots pine, ponderosa pine, Siberian larch, Black Hills spruce, Elaeagnus, and Rocky Mountain juniper. Wildlife includes deer, wild turkeys, porcupines, elk, and sometimes moose. The forest is also popular with birdwatchers.

The forest was established in 1931 on a site extensively over-plowed and overgrazed during the early part of the 20th century, leaving wind-blown sand dunes and economic hardship. It was originally envisioned as part of a grand plan by President Franklin Delano Roosevelt to plant a 100-mile (160 km) wide "shelterbelt zone" from North Dakota to north Texas to reduce wind erosion and eliminate dust storms, as well as provide local employment in the Great Depression via a jobs program. Proponents envisioned a forest as large as 480,000 acres (1900 km²) around the forest's current site.

This grand vision never came to pass, and the forest was established with the more modest goals of determining which types of shelterbelt trees would grow well in the northern Great Plains, which seed sources within species are best adapted for the region, and which methods of tree establishment are most effective for shelterbelts. The Forest Service acquired 40 acres (160,000 m^{2}) of the 636 in 1931, and the State of North Dakota retained control of the other 596 acres (2.4 km²). In 1971, the Forest Service acquired the entire tract. The entire section has been managed as one unit for experimental purposes since 1931, however. More than 40 species were planted from throughout the United States, Europe, and Asia, of which about 30 species have survived.

The forest has also been used cooperatively by the Custer National Forest, North Dakota Forest Service, Agricultural Research service, and North Dakota State University, Fargo. It is no longer being used for research, although it currently provides approximately 500,000 seedlings per year for wind protection of crops and communities throughout the United States and Canada.

The forest is now in the process of being de-commissioned and returned to the administrative control of the Custer National Forest.

== See also ==
- List of botanical gardens in the United States
