= Clemson Experimental Forest =

Clemson University Forest
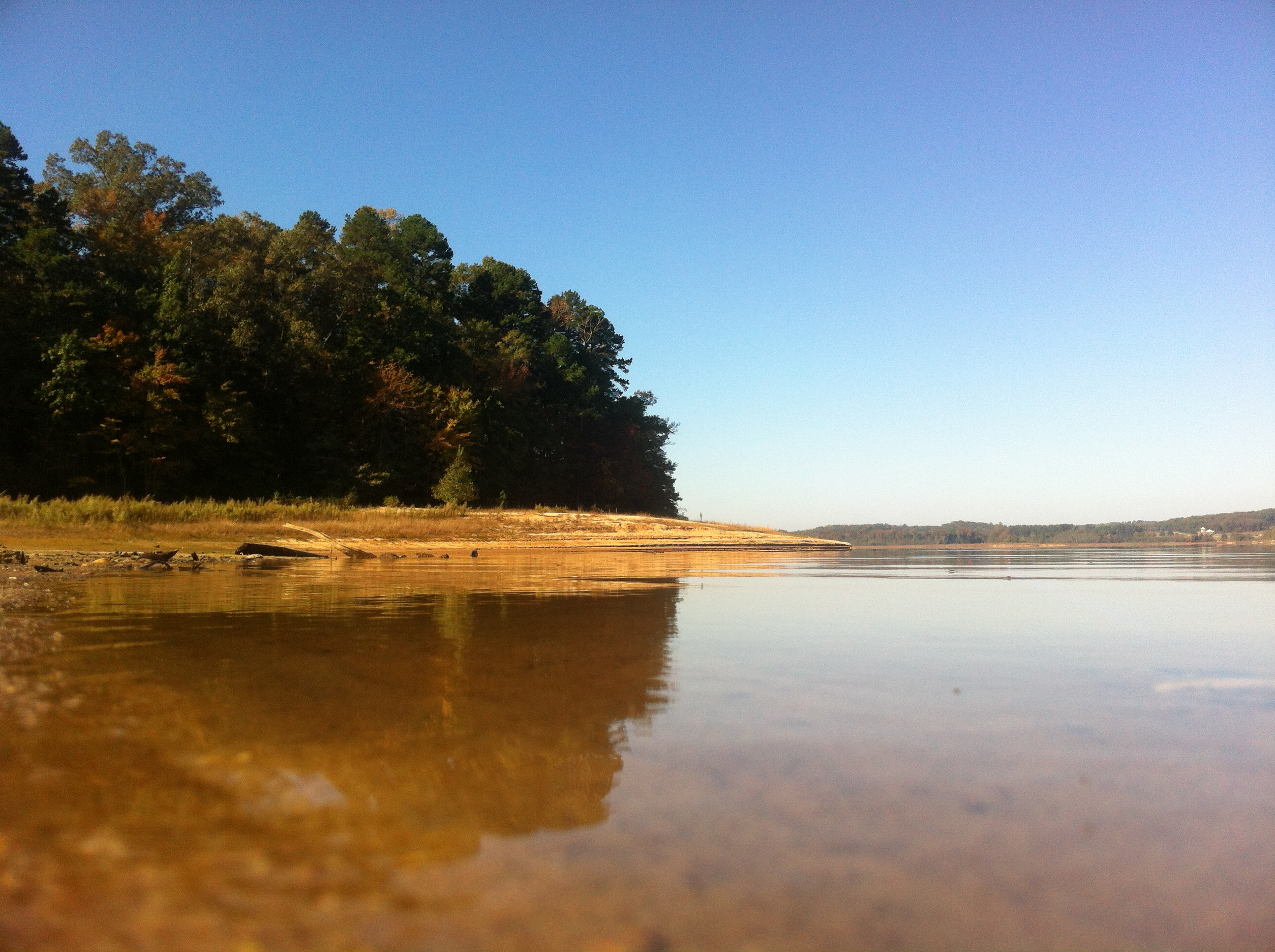
- A view from Lake Hartwell of the Clemson University Forest

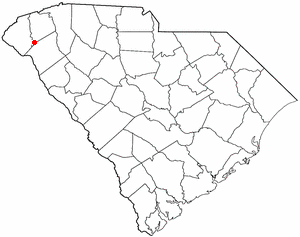
- Location of Clemson, South Carolina
- Coordinates: 34°41′6″N 82°48′53″W
- Country: United States
- State: South Carolina
- Counties: Pickens, Anderson

Clemson University Forest, a 19,200 acre forest surrounding Clemson University, is a natural resource laboratory. It is a product of a land reclamation project funded by Franklin D. Roosevelt Administration's New Deal programs. The forest is habitat for more than 195 species of birds and more than 90 species of trees. The forest is used for research, education, and recreation.

== History ==
The United States Congress addressed the problem of sub-marginal agricultural lands in the Agricultural Act of 1929. In 1933, with an effort to improve economic conditions, President Franklin D. Roosevelt issued an executive order establishing public funds to be made available to acquire worn-out farmland. In August 1933, Dr. George Aull, a 1918 graduate of Clemson Agricultural College, sent a proposal for Fant’s Grove Community Development Project to Washington. He proposed that the government purchase 8,500 acres. This proposal was turned down. He adjusted his proposal, now named the Clemson College Conservation Project, and resubmitted it. Under the condition that the government would own and manage the land, the proposal was accepted. E.W. Sikes, president of Clemson College at the time, named Aull project manager. Work of the project started in August 1934. Starting off, Aull directed men to clear stands of timber, to build fire lanes, and to clear streambeds. Aull hired two Clemson College engineers to design and build a dam on Six Mile Creek to form Lake Issaquena. He also started them planting seedlings. In particular, the men planted gum, pine, poplar and oak. At the end of his second year as project manager, Aull decided to resign his duties and regain his position as chairman of the Department of Agricultural Economics at Clemson. Between 1942 and 1945, one hundred thirty-five acres of northern forest were leased to the United States Air Corps for bombing practice. In 1946, Clemson’s President R.F. Poole hired Norbert B. Goebel, a graduate in forest management of Duke University, as Forest manager of the project, then known as the Land Use Project. On December 22, 1954, a bill introduced by Senator Charles E. Daniel and Senator Strom Thurmond was passed deeding the 27,469 acres of land of the project to Clemson College for the price of one dollar. This bill reserved the United States certain mineral rights and restricted the lands to be forever used for public purposes. In 1977, the Forest was selected by the Institute of Ecology as one of the 67 primary experimental ecological reserves in the nation. Only 17 of the 171 considered ranked higher than Clemson.

== Geography and geology ==
The Clemson University Forest lands extend eight miles north and eight miles south of the Clemson University campus. The land is in the Southern Piedmont Soil Resource area. The parent soil consisted of granites, phyllites and various schists and gneisses formed in the late Precambrian to early Paleozoic age. Elevations of the forest range from 650 to 1,000 feet above mean sea level. The northern section of the forest is in the transition zone between the Piedmont and Mountain Physiographic regions. The southern section of the forest is of the Piedmont physiographic region.

== Ecology ==
=== Trees ===
The Clemson University Forest is home to more than 90 species of trees. In the dry ridges, these species include blackjack oak, post oak, shortleaf pine and Virginia pine. In the mid-slopes of the forest the major species of trees are bitternut hickory, black oak, black gum, flowering dogwood, sourwood, southern red oak and white oak. In the lower slopes of the forest, the main species of trees include American beech, northern red oak, sweet gum, tulip poplar and white pine. In the bottom lands of the forest, the species of trees include black walnut, box elder, green ash, hackberry, river birch and sycamore. There are three South Carolina champion trees that are found in the forest: a 115-foot white basswood, a 97-foot chinkapin oak, and a 20-foot rusty blackhaw.

=== Wildlife ===
Birds of the forest include bald eagle, broad-winged hawk, Cooper’s hawk, northern harrier, osprey, kestrel falcon, merlin falcon, barn owl, and barred owl. Mammals of the forest include beaver, American black bear, bobcat, coyote, gray fox, raccoon, red fox, and white-tail deer.

== Management and protection ==
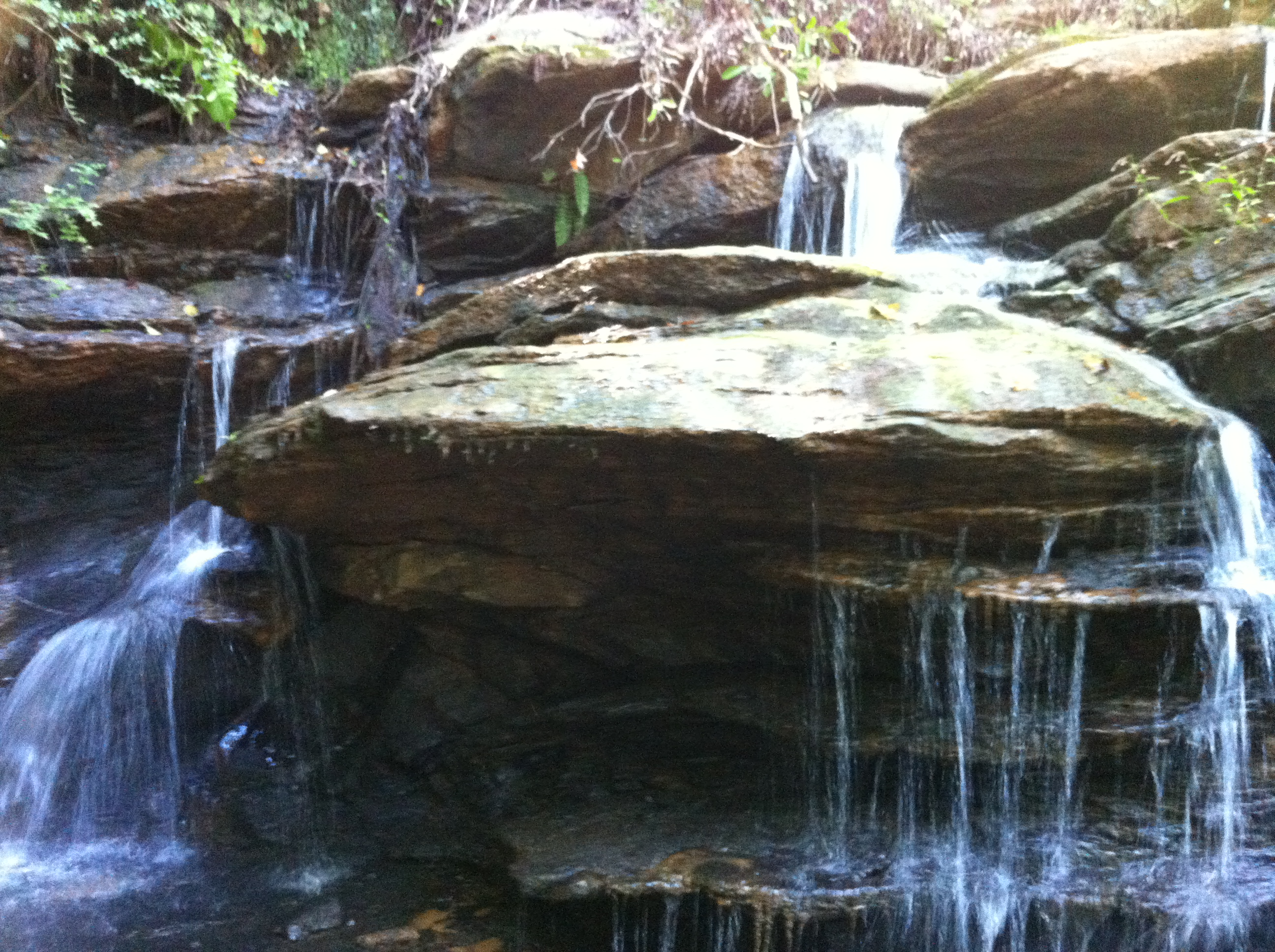
Closeup of Waldrop Stone Falls in the Clemson University Forest.

The Clemson University Forest is managed for maintained yield of forest products including timber, clean water and air, and wildlife. The revenue generated by the forest supports the forest personnel, and forest equipment and supplies. A continuous forest inventory, CFI, system was launched in 1958. Measurement locations were set at grid intervals, 2000 ft apart, over the entire forest. The data recorded from the CFI system is used to adjust allowable harvest, schedule harvest and evaluate forest health. In 1978, The Management Alternative Research Project, MARP, was initiated to evaluate the long-term effects of three management strategies on large forest areas. For this, the forest was divided into three separate forests: the commercial forest, the multiple-use forest, and the protection forest. MARP’s purpose is to measure the biological, economic, and social responses to the effects of forest cultural practices and to interpret those responses on the environment and society. The forest is a member of the American Tree Farm System and the Sustainable Forestry Initiative.

== Research and teaching ==
The Fire and Fire Surrogate study is conducted by the USDA Forest Service along with the Clemson University University Forest. It is part of a national network of research sites analyzing the effects of fuel reduction techniques on ecosystems. The Clemson University Forest serves as an outdoor laboratory for many disciplines at the university. In 2012, 37 classes utilize the forest. Clemson and Furman University Army ROTC use the south forest to perform dismounted tactical maneuvers and orienteering training.

== Recreation ==
The Clemson University Forest trail system is divided into three areas: Todds Creek, Issaqueena, and Fants Grove. The trails are used for teaching, research and public recreation. Public recreation use of the trails includes birdwatching, mountain biking, hiking and horseback riding. Fishing and hunting are also allowed in the forest and are regulated by South Carolina Department of Natural Resources.

Waterfall:

Waldrop Stone Falls- The location for parking is at the corner of Madden Bridge Road and Waldrop Stone Road. The waterfall is a one-mile hike that leads to a 50-foot tall waterfall. The trail difficulty is easy, and it is dog friendly. Camping and mountain biking are not allowed on this trail. The GPS coordinates are as follows:Parking Area: 34.738505, -82.826153 Actual Location: 34.739568, -82.820751

Mountain Biking:

Issaqueena Mountain Biking: Located at the Old 6 Mile Road and Issaqueena Lake Road, there are various trails that consist of intersecting courses. Some of the trails are maintained while others are not and contain various routes. The outer loop trail around the lake is 10.3 miles long. All trails are also open to pedestrians and people on horseback.

Fant's Grove Mountain Biking: Parking area is located on Seed Orchard Road, and this location consists of three separate trails: Fant's Grove Trail (4.3 Miles long), Quarry Trail (5.9 miles long), and Swine Farm Trail (2.6 miles long). The trails are open to the public for pedestrians, people on horseback, and mountain bikers. A map is available thanks to Clemson University if you click here.
