= Reef (company) =

Brand of sandals

- Type: Private
- Genre: Surfing
- Founded: 1984
- Founder: Fernando & Santiago Aguerre
- Headquarters: Carlsbad, California, United States
- Website: www.reef.com

Reef is an American brand of casual sandals, known as flip-flops (Australia: thongs, New Zealand: jandals), created by two Argentine brothers, Fernando and Santiago Aguerre. In 1984, they moved from Argentina to the San Diego beach community of La Jolla, California, where they began Reef. Their product became popular amongst surfers and beach goers. Reef has subsequently grown into one of the world's leading active sandal manufacturers.

Reef was acquired by VF Corporation in 2005 and was subsequently sold to the Rockport Group in 2018.
