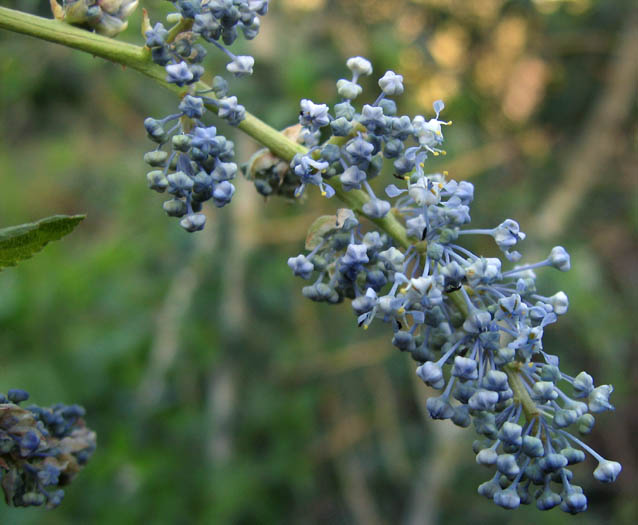

Conservation status
- Vulnerable (NatureServe)

Scientific classification
- Kingdom: Plantae
- Clade: Embryophytes
- Clade: Tracheophytes
- Clade: Spermatophytes
- Clade: Angiosperms
- Clade: Eudicots
- Clade: Rosids
- Order: Rosales
- Family: Rhamnaceae
- Genus: Ceanothus
- Species: C. leucodermis

Binomial name
- Ceanothus leucodermis Greene

= Ceanothus leucodermis =

Chaparral whitethorn

Species of flowering plant

Ceanothus leucodermis, with the common names chaparral whitethorn or chaparral white thorn, is a species of shrub in the family Rhamnaceae. This Ceanothus is an importance browse for several types of ungulate, such as the mule deer and bighorn sheep, who prefer the new growth and shoots to the older, spiny parts.

== Range and habitat ==
It is native to California and Baja California, where it grows in coastal and inland mountain habitat, such as chaparral, coniferous forest, and oak woodland.

== Description ==
Ceanothus leucodermis is a thorny shrub growing erect to heights approaching 4 meters. The bark is gray-white, waxy, and somewhat hairy, especially when new. The twigs harden into sharp-tipped thorns as they age. The evergreen leaves are alternately arranged, oval in shape and up to about 4 centimeters long. The edges are smooth or lined with tiny glandular teeth. Leaves are covered with a delicate, white powdery coating that can be rubbed off. Stipules, the small leaf-like structures on the stem at the base of the stem of the leaf (petiole), are thin and fall off early, compared to other members of the genus.

The inflorescence is a long, stalked cluster of flowers in shades of blue, lavender, or white. The fruit is a sticky, three-lobed capsule about half a centimeter long. Fruits do not have horns, as do some other members of this genus.
