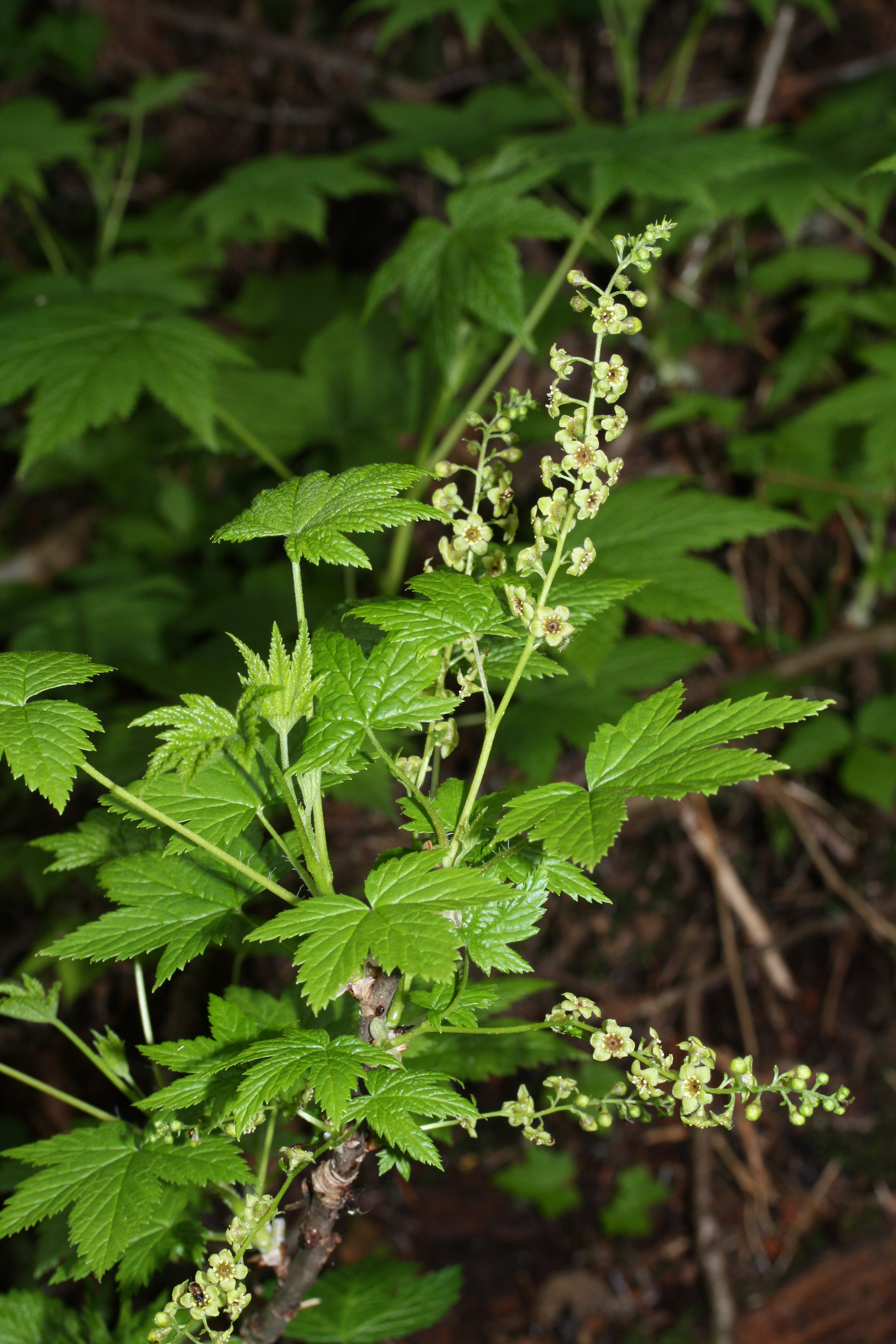

Scientific classification
- Kingdom: Plantae
- Clade: Tracheophytes
- Clade: Angiosperms
- Clade: Eudicots
- Order: Saxifragales
- Family: Grossulariaceae
- Genus: Ribes
- Species: R. bracteosum

Binomial name
- Ribes bracteosum Dougl. 1832

= Ribes bracteosum =

Species of currant

Ribes bracteosum (known by the common names stink currant and fragrant currant), is a species of currant native to western coastal North America.

R. bracteosum is a deciduous shrub, without thorns, growing to 3 metres (10 feet) tall. The leaves are 5–20 centimetres (2–8 inches) across, palmately lobed with 5 or 7 lobes. The flowers are produced in spring after the leaves emerge, on racemes 15–30 cm (6–12 in) long containing 20–40 flowers; each flower is 5–10 millimetres (3/16–3/8 inch) in diameter, with five white or greenish-tinged petals. The fruit, born in clusters, is dark blue with a whitish bloom.

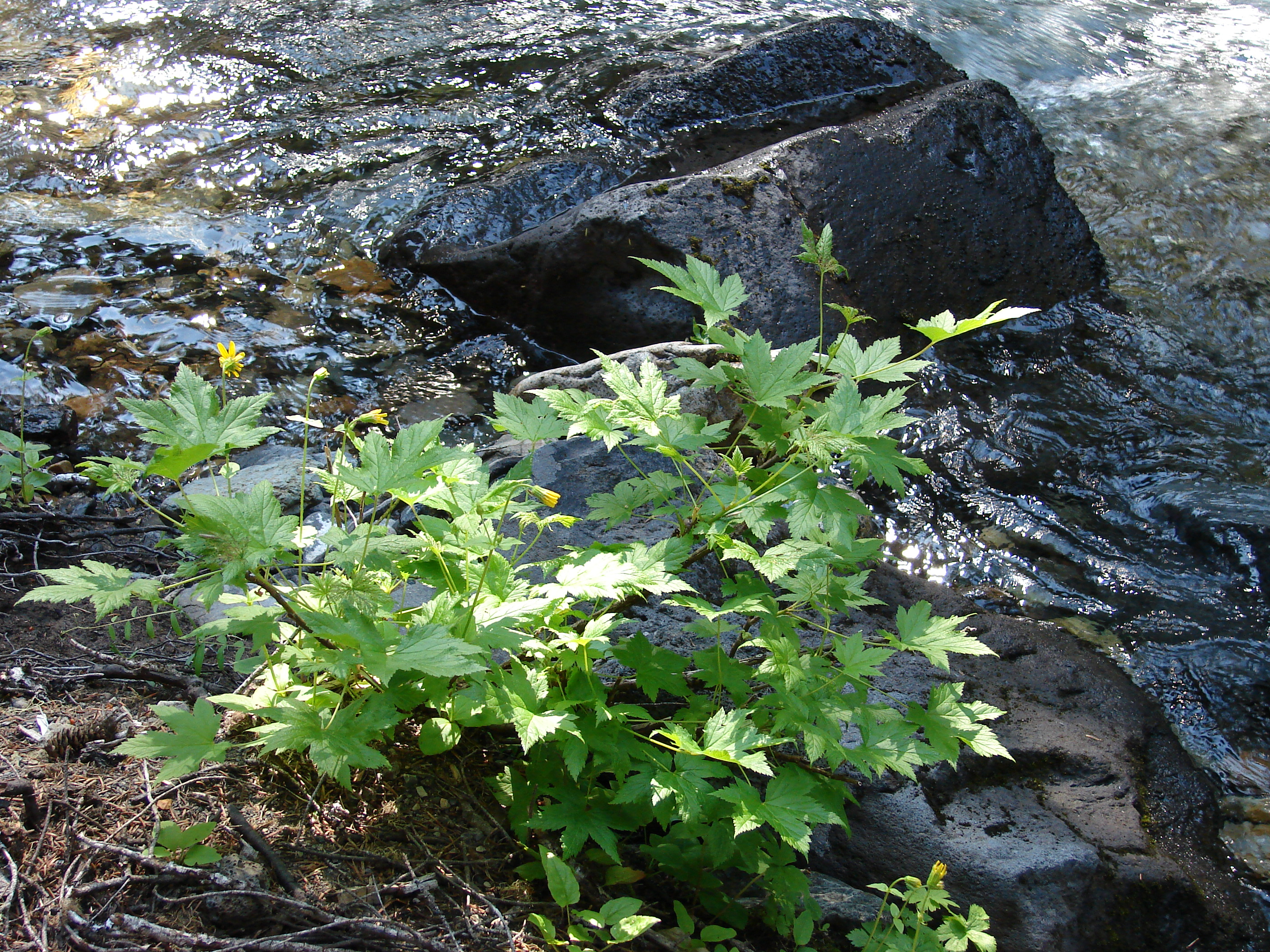
Plant in the U.S.

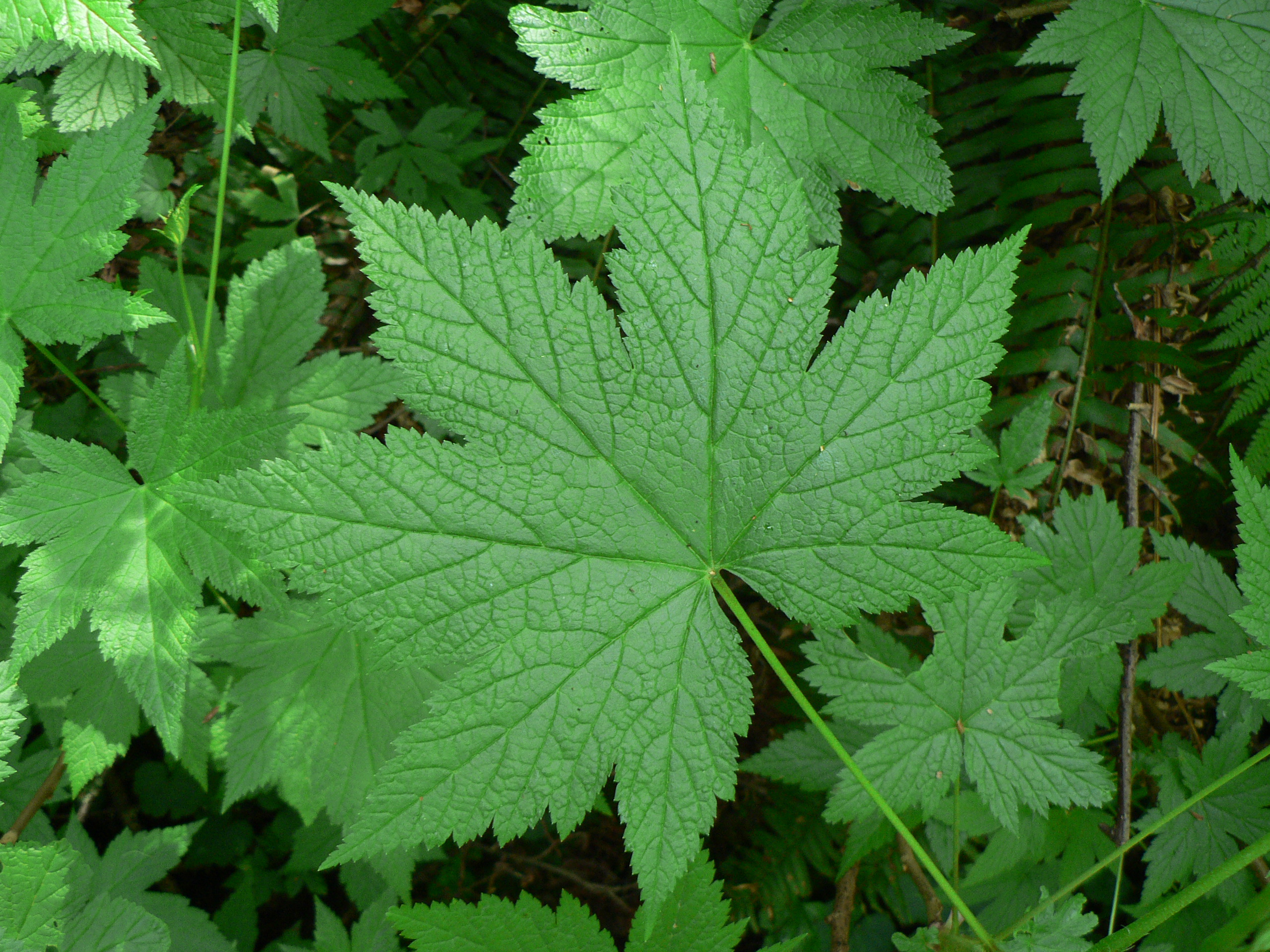
Leaf structure

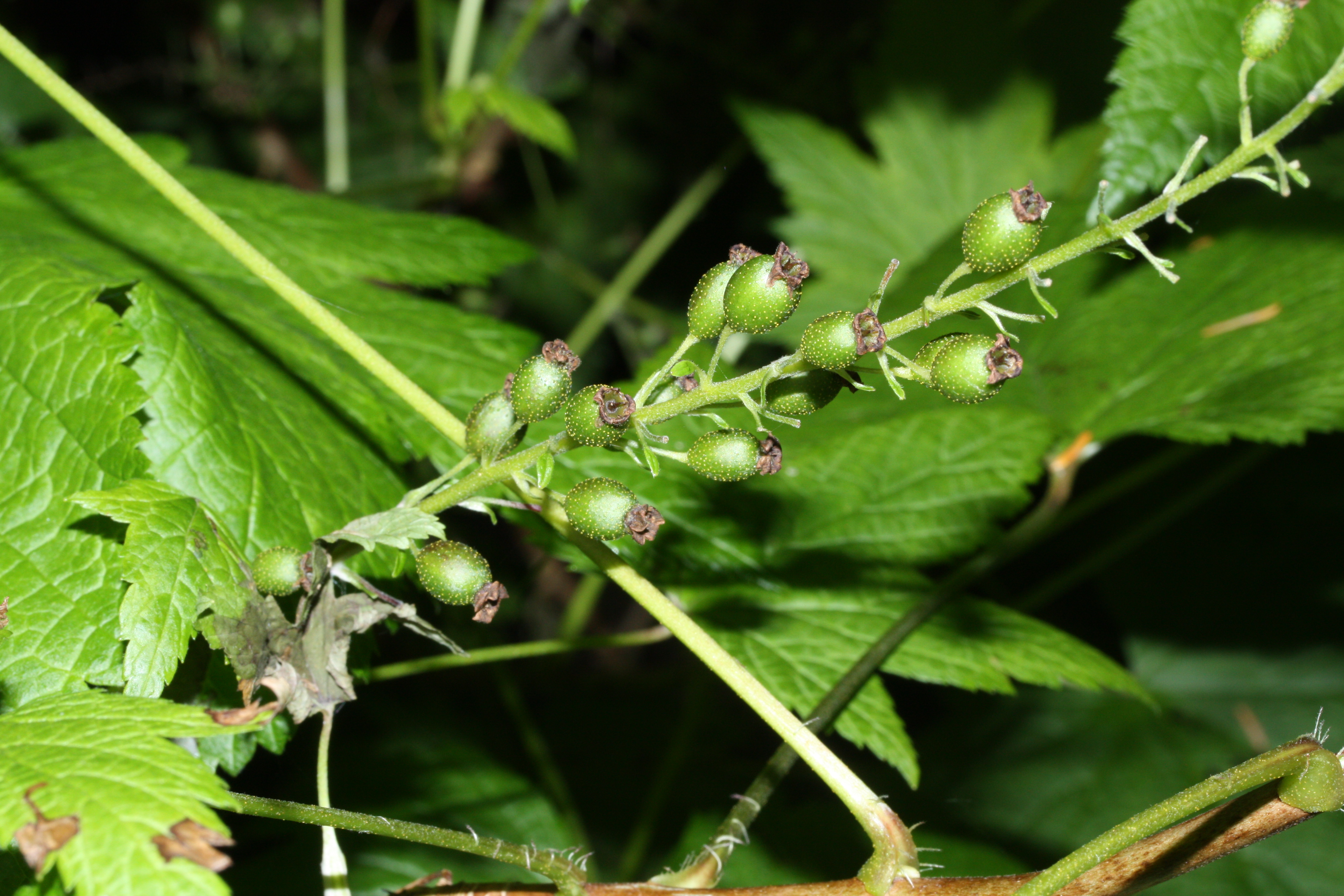
Buds

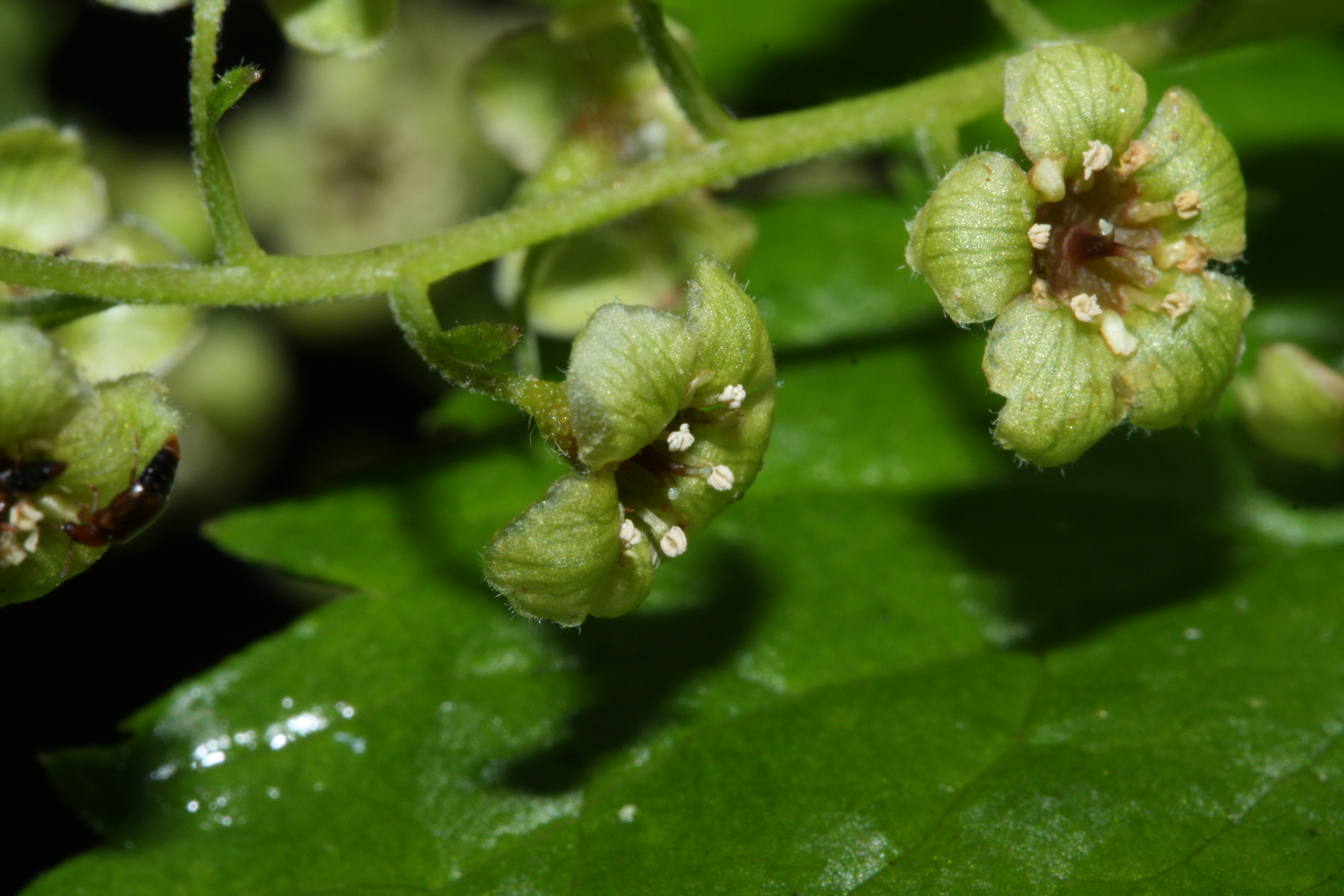
Close-up of flowers

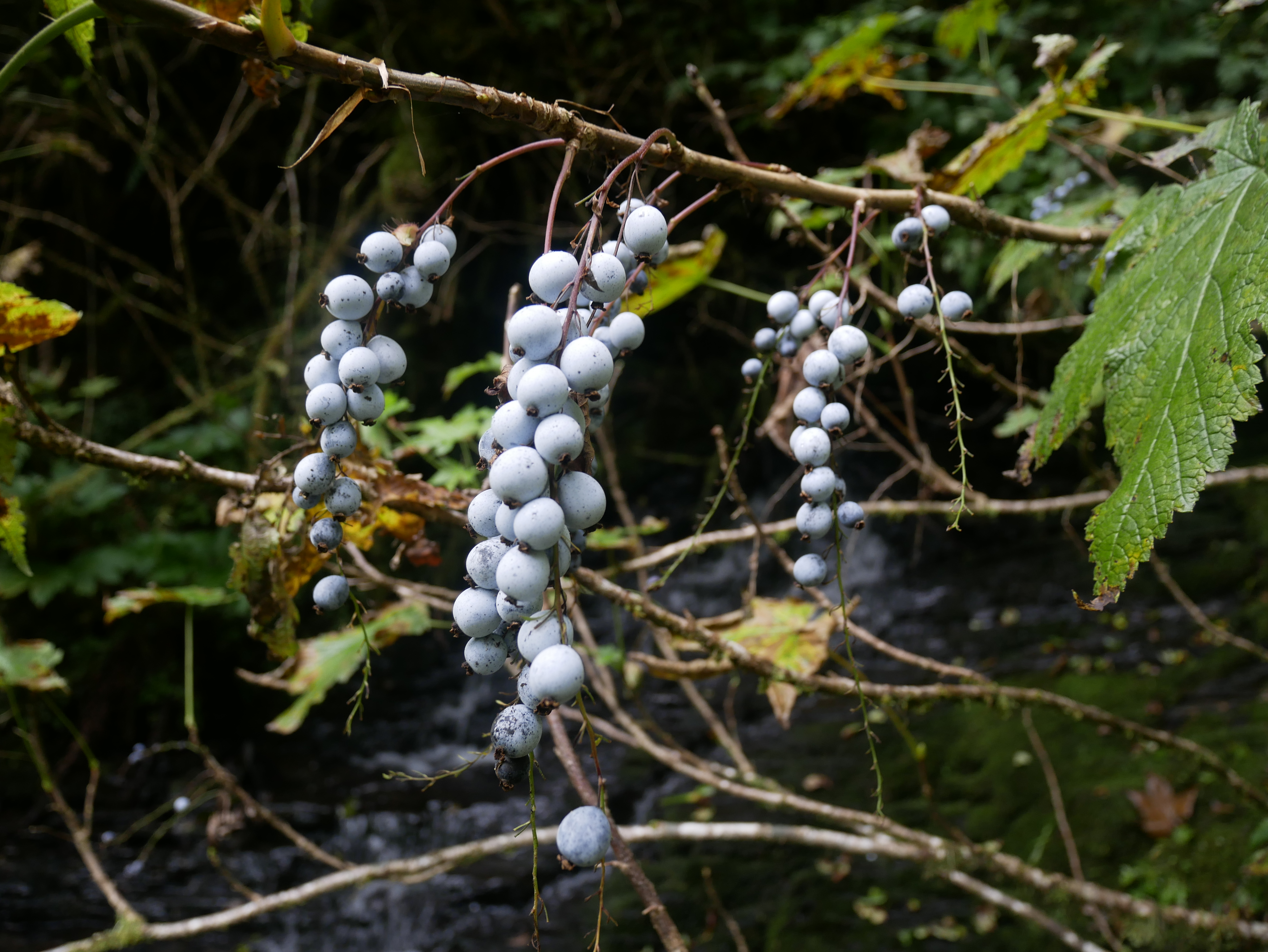
Ripe fruit

== Distribution and habitat ==
It is native to western coastal North America from southeastern Alaska to Mendocino County in California. Its habitats include stream banks, moist woods, shorelines and thickets.

== Uses ==
The fruit is edible but sometimes unpleasant.
