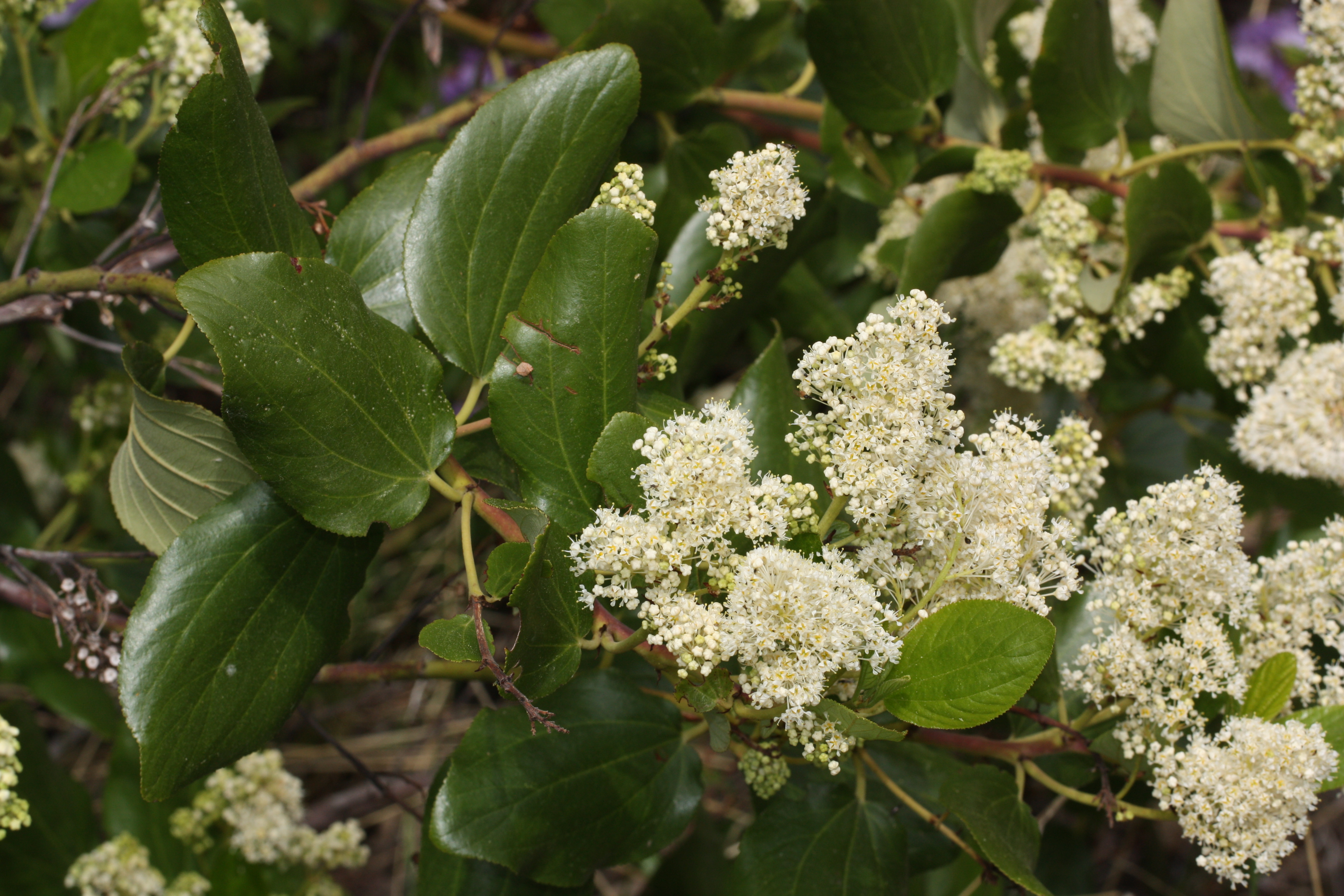

Conservation status
- Least Concern (IUCN 3.1)

- Secure (NatureServe)

Scientific classification
- Kingdom: Plantae
- Clade: Tracheophytes
- Clade: Angiosperms
- Clade: Eudicots
- Clade: Rosids
- Order: Rosales
- Family: Rhamnaceae
- Genus: Ceanothus
- Species: C. velutinus

Binomial name
- Ceanothus velutinus Dougl. ex Hook.

Varieties
- Ceanothus velutinus var. laevigatus Torr. & A.Gray; Ceanothus velutinus var. velutinus

Synonyms
- synonyms of var. laevigatus: Ceanothus laevigatus Hook., nom. illeg. homonym. post.; Ceanothus velutinus subsp. hookeri C.L.Schmidt, basionym ref. incomplete.; Ceanothus velutinus var. hookeri M.C.Johnst., nom. illeg. superfl.; Ceanothus velutinus subsp. laevigatus (Torr. & A.Gray) Piper & Beattie; synonyms of var. velutinus: Ceanothus grandis Douglas ex Hook.

= Ceanothus velutinus =

Species of tree

Ceanothus velutinus, with the common names snowbrush ceanothus, red root, tobacco brush, and sticky laurel, is a species of shrub in the family Rhamnaceae. It is native to western North America from British Columbia to California to Colorado.

Two varieties are accepted:

- Ceanothus velutinus var. laevigatus Torr. & A.Gray – British Columbia, Washington, Oregon, and California
- Ceanothus velutinus var. velutinus – Alberta, British Columbia, California, Colorado, Idaho, Nevata, Oregon, South Dakota, Washington, and Wyoming

== Description ==
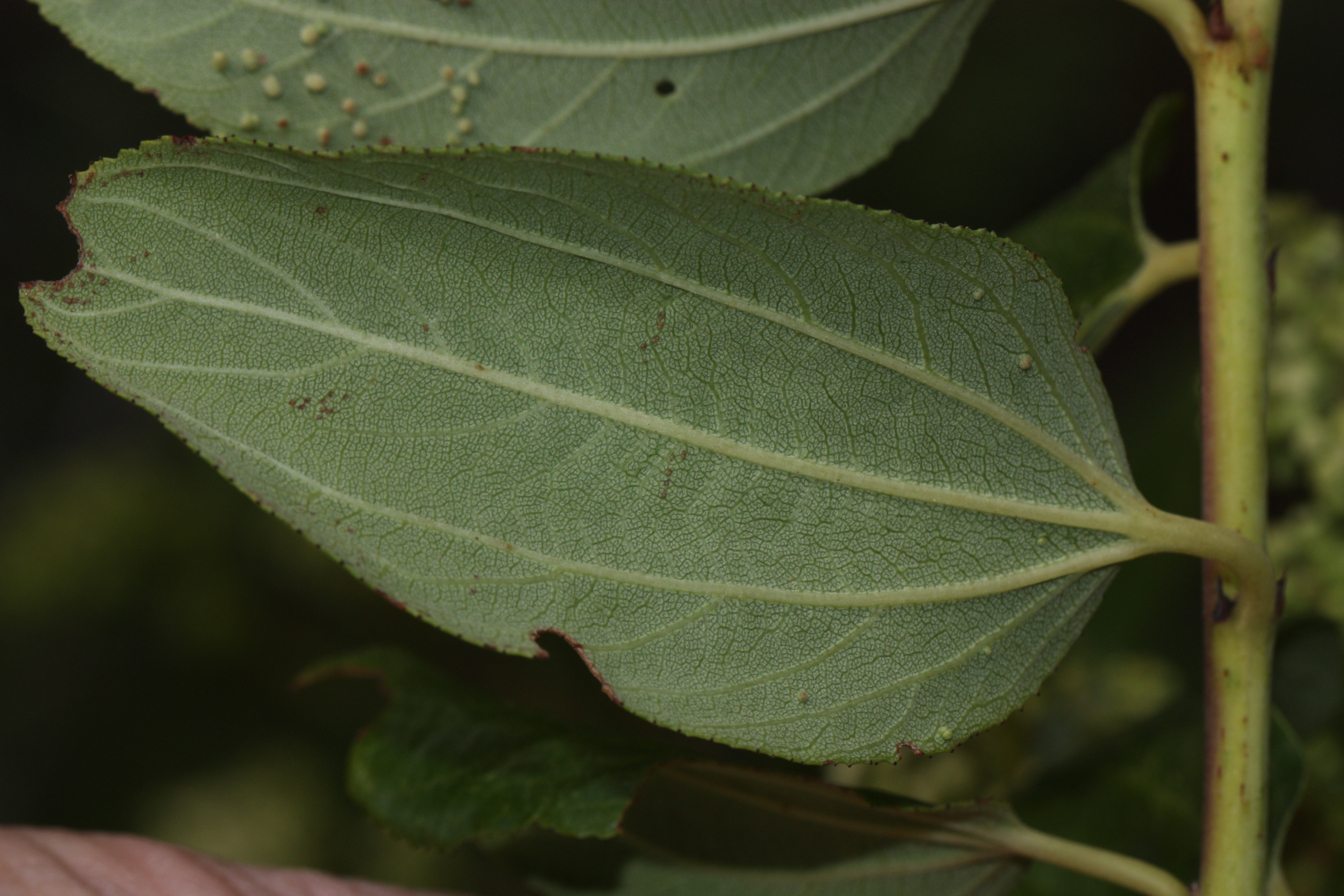
The oval leaves have tiny teeth with glands along the edges.

Ceanothus velutinus grows up to 4 metres (13 feet) tall but generally remains under 3 metres, and forms colonies of individuals which tangle together to form nearly impenetrable thickets. The aromatic evergreen leaves are alternately arranged, each up to 8 centimetres (3 inches) long. The leaves are oval in shape with minute glandular teeth along the edges, and shiny green and hairless on the top surface.

The plentiful inflorescences are long clusters of white flowers. The fruit is a three-lobed capsule a few millimeters long which snaps open explosively to expel the three seeds onto the soil, where they may remain in a buried seed bank for well over 200 years before sprouting. The seed is coated in a very hard outer layer that must be scarified, generally by wildfire, before it can germinate. Like most other Ceanothus, this species fixes nitrogen via actinomycetes in its root nodules.

== Distribution and habitat ==
Ceanothus velutinus is native to western North America from British Columbia to California to Colorado, where it grows in hills and mountains in several habitat types including open coniferous forest and chaparral, often in rocky soils.

== Uses ==
Deer and elk browse the plant during winter.

Some Plateau Indian tribes drank a boil of this plant to induce sweating as a treatment for colds, fevers, and influenza. Leaves were also used when rinsing to help prevent dandruff.

Ceanothus velutinus was known as "red root" by many Native American tribes due to the color of the inner root bark, and was used as a medicine for treating lymphatic disorders, ovarian cysts, fibroid tumors, and tonsillitis.
