= Bridgeview (disambiguation) =

Bridgeview, Illinois is a suburb of Chicago, United States.

Bridgeview may also refer to:

== Canada ==
- Bridgeview, Alberta
- Bridgeview, Surrey, British Columbia
- Bridgeview, Nova Scotia

== United States ==
- Bridgeview/Greenlawn, Baltimore
- Bridgeview Vineyard and Winery, Oregon
- BridgeView (San Francisco)

== See also ==
- Bridge View Inn
