= Placer, Oregon =

Unincorporated community in the state of Oregon, United States

- Unincorporated community
- Location within Oregon Location within the United States
- Coordinates: 42°37′55″N 123°18′55″W
- Country: United States
- State: Oregon
- County: Josephine
- Elevation: 1,431 ft (436 m)
- Time zone: UTC-8 (Pacific (PST))
  - Summer (DST): UTC-7 (PDT)
- ZIP codes: 97497
- GNIS feature ID: 1125461

Placer is an unincorporated community in Josephine County, Oregon, United States, on Grave Creek a few miles east of Interstate 5. Established during the local gold mining boom, it is considered a ghost town.

== History ==
Placer was unofficially established in 1885 as "Tom East" and platted in 1898 by pioneer landowner L. M. Browning, who had arrived in the area in 1870. Tom East was an early southwest Oregon miner, who came to the U.S. from England as a young man. He was mining in Josephine County by 1855, and at least three Tom East Creeks and one East Creek were named for him. In the 1870s, he prospected and mined along the Rogue River, eventually settling on Brushy Bar near the future site of the community of Marial, where he lived until his death in 1897.

The first post office at this locale was applied for in 1893 by Newell Fillmore Inman with the name Tom East, but the Post Office Department changed the name to "Placer". Placer was named for the placer mines in the area. Placer post office ran from 1894 to 1924, with mail then going to Leland.

Placer was established as a supply center for the Tom East and Upper Grave Creek mines and was on the stagecoach line between New Leland and the Greenback Mine. In its heyday, Placer had two large hotels, two large mercantiles and three saloons—the only ones on Upper Grave Creek—as well as other small businesses, including a newspaper edited by Nellie Anderson. Placer grew rapidly with the development of the Columbia placer mine and the Greenback quartz mine, which was the richest mine in Oregon by feet of tunnel mined.

== See also ==
- Golden, Oregon, another mining ghost town in Josephine County
- List of ghost towns in Oregon
