= Grave Creek Bridge =

Covered bridge in Oregon, US

- U.S. National Register of Historic Places
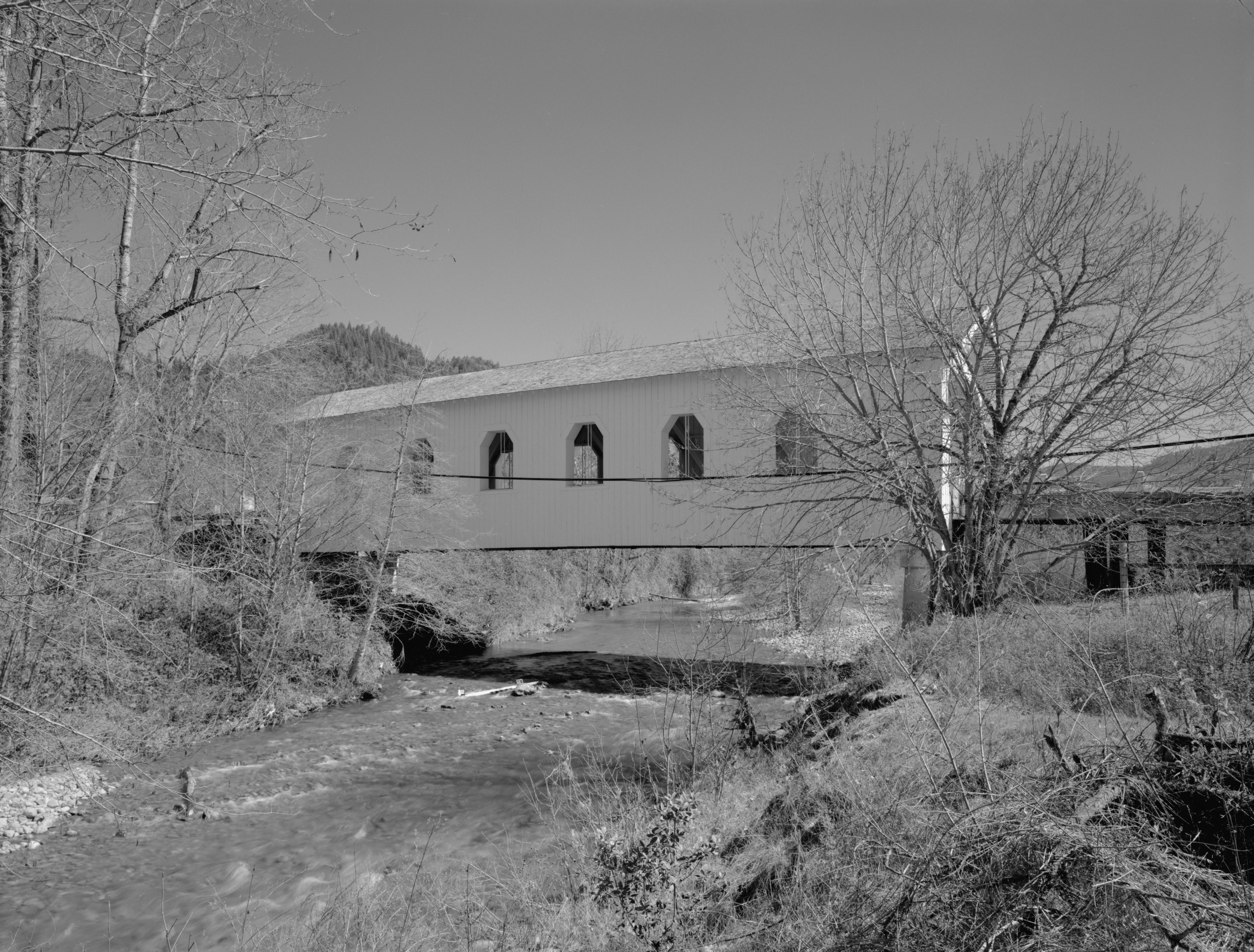
- Grave Creek Bridge over Grave Creek near Sunny Valley

- Location within Oregon Location within the United States
- Coordinates: 42°38′10″N 123°22′39″W
- Built: 1920
- Architect: A. A. Clausen and J. Elmer Nelson
- Architectural style: Howe truss
- MPS: Oregon Covered Bridges TR
- NRHP reference No.: 79002077
- Listed: November 29, 1979

The Grave Creek Bridge is a covered bridge in Josephine County in the U.S. state of Oregon. It carries Sunny Valley Loop Road over Grave Creek about 15 miles (24 km) north of Grants Pass and within sight of Interstate 5 (I-5).

Built in 1920, it originally carried U.S. Route 99, the Pacific Highway. The only remaining covered bridge in Josephine County, it is "Oregon's most viewed covered bridge" because of its location near I-5.

The structure was added to the National Register of Historic Places in 1979. It was closed for repairs in the late 1990s and reopened in 2001.

The 105-foot (32 m) Howe truss bridge features six Gothic windows on each side as well as rounded portals and a shake roof. The original architects were A. A. Clausen and J. Elmer Nelson.

== See also ==
- List of bridges documented by the Historic American Engineering Record in Oregon
- List of bridges on the National Register of Historic Places in Oregon
- List of Oregon covered bridges
