= Holland, Oregon =

Unincorporated community in the state of Oregon, United States

- Unincorporated community
- Location within Oregon Location within the United States
- Coordinates: 42.127616°N 123.538953°W
- Country: United States
- State: Oregon
- County: Josephine
- Elevation: 1,513 ft (461 m)
- Time zone: UTC-8 (Pacific (PST))
  - Summer (DST): UTC-7 (PDT)
- Area codes: 458 and 541
- GNIS feature ID: 1143665

Holland is an unincorporated community in Josephine County, Oregon, United States. It is about eight miles southeast of Cave Junction, in the Illinois Valley south of Oregon Route 46.

Holland post office was established in 1899 and named for area pioneer James E. Holland. The office closed in 1960.

Holland is in the heart of the Josephine County gold mining district and is the home of the Holland Loop Store and Foris Vineyards Winery.
