= Illinois Valley Airport =

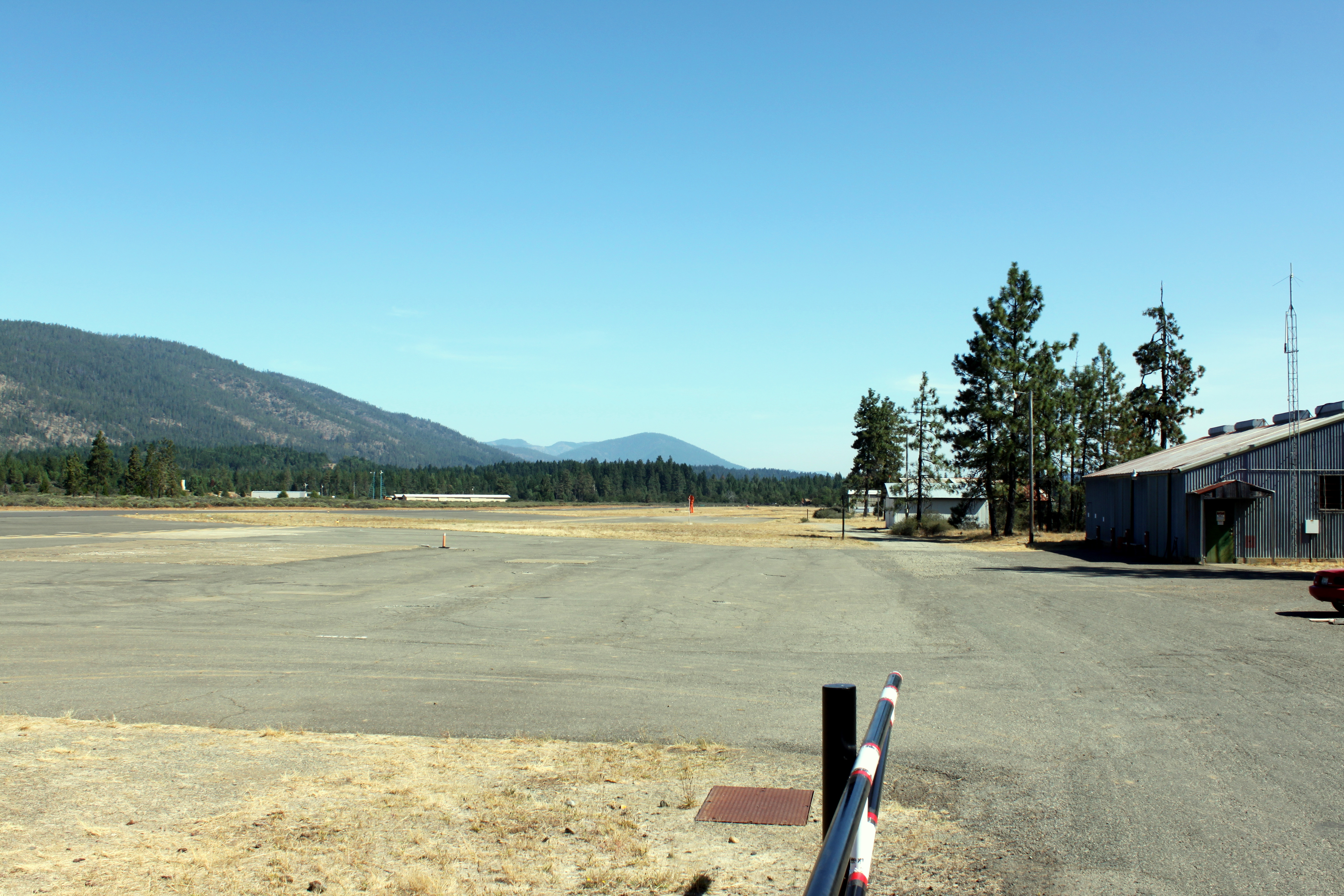
- IATA: none; ICAO: none; FAA LID: 3S4

Summary
- Airport type: Public
- Owner: Josephine County Airports
- Location: Cave Junction, Oregon
- Elevation AMSL: 1,394 ft (425 m)
- Coordinates: 42°06′13″N 123°40′57″W
- Interactive map of Illinois Valley Airport

Runways
| Direction | Length | | Surface |
| Direction | ft | m | Surface |
|---|---|---|---|
| 18/36 | 4,807 | 1,465 | Asphalt |

Statistics (2021)
- Aircraft operations (year ending 5/11/2021): 6,000
- Based aircraft: 19
- Source: Federal Aviation Administration

- Siskiyou Smokejumper Base
- U.S. National Register of Historic Places
- U.S. Historic district
- Location within Oregon Location within the United States
- Nearest city: Cave Junction, Oregon
- Coordinates: 42°6′16″N 123°40′48″W
- Architectural style: mid-20th-century rustic
- NRHP reference No.: 06001035 (original); 14000960 (increase)

Significant dates
- Added to NRHP: November 17, 2006
- Boundary increase: November 24, 2014

Illinois Valley Airport (FAA LID: 3S4) is a county-owned public-use airport located four miles (6.4 km) southwest of the central business district of Cave Junction, a city in Josephine County, Oregon, United States.

== History ==
The Illinois Valley Airport, also known as the Siskiyou Smokejumper Base, or even the Cave Junction Airport, was built by the US Forest Service. It operated from 1943 to 1981 as a smokejumper base, during which time the smokejumpers parachuted on 1445 fires for 5390 fire jumps, or about 142 jumps per year. The Smokejumper Base is currently operating as the Siskiyou Smokejumper Base Museum and free tours of the museum are available daily from March 15 to November 15. Major building restoration projects and ground maintenance have been performed by community members and retired smokejumper volunteers over the course of several years.

=== Moon Trees ===
Lunar orbiter commander Stuart Roosa was a firefighter at the Siskiyou Smokejumper Base in 1954. In 1971, Roosa took a packet of Douglas Fir seeds with him to the moon, and when he returned the Forest Service planted these "Moon Trees" across the US, including two at the Illinois Valley Airport. The smokejumpers cared for these trees, but after their departure, both trees died. The Moon Tree Run (10k) was held annually to honor Roosa's achievement when the site was operating as a fire base. The Moon Tree Run has only recently begun to be held once again thanks to volunteer efforts. The mixed terrain race is similar to the original race course and there is also a 5k race offered.

== Facilities and aircraft ==
Illinois Valley Airport covers an area of 175 acres (71 ha) which contains one asphalt paved runway (18/36) measuring 4,807 x 75 ft (1,465 x 23 m). For the 12-month period ending May 11, 2021, the airport had 6,000 aircraft operations, all of which were general aviation.

The airport has a specialty flight school offering primary flight training specifically for light sport and ultralight airplane and gyroplane. The school known as Captain Drake's Family Aerial Adventures, offers complete training packages including housing for out of town clients. fixed-base operator, aircraft rentals and instruction, hangar rentals, and a small campground. All other services are four miles (6 km) north in Cave Junction.
