= Redwood, Oregon =

Unincorporated community in the state of Oregon, United States

- Census-designated place
- Location of Redwood, Oregon
- Coordinates: 42°25′19″N 123°23′14″W
- Country: United States
- State: Oregon
- County: Josephine

Area
  - Total: 3.51 sq mi (9.09 km^{2})
  - Land: 3.46 sq mi (8.95 km^{2})
  - Water: 0.054 sq mi (0.14 km^{2})
- Elevation: 935 ft (285 m)

Population (2020)
  - Total: 2,702
  - Density: 782/sq mi (301.9/km^{2})
- Time zone: UTC-8 (Pacific (PST))
  - Summer (DST): UTC-7 (PDT)
- FIPS code: 41-61250
- GNIS feature ID: 1867477

Redwood is a census-designated place (CDP) in Josephine County, Oregon, United States. As of the 2020 census, Redwood had a population of 2,702. It has lost territory to the neighboring city of Grants Pass.

== Geography ==
Redwood is in eastern Josephine County, in the valley of the Rogue River. It is bordered to the east by the city of Grants Pass, the county seat. According to the United States Census Bureau, the CDP has a total area of 3.5 square miles (9.1 km^{2}), down from 4.9 square miles (12.7 km^{2}) in 2000. As of 2010, 0.05 square miles (0.14 km^{2}) within Redwood, or 1.54%, are water. The community is 935 feet (285 m) above sea level.

U.S. Route 199 runs through the southern side of Redwood, leading east into Grants Pass and southwest 25 miles (40 km) to Cave Junction.

== Demographics ==
Historical population
Census	Pop.	Note	%±
2020	2,702		—
U.S. Decennial Census

As of the census of 2000, there were 5,844 people, 2,390 households, and 1,684 families residing in the CDP. The population density was 1,207.3 inhabitants per square mile (466.1/km^{2}). There were 2,529 housing units at an average density of 522.5 per square mile (201.7/km^{2}). The racial makeup of the CDP was 94.87% White, 0.31% African American, 1.01% Native American, 0.33% Asian, 0.07% Pacific Islander, 0.77% from other races, and 2.65% from two or more races. Hispanic or Latino of any race were 3.68% of the population.

There were 2,390 households, out of which 30.5% had children under the age of 18 living with them, 54.5% were married couples living together, 11.7% had a female householder with no husband present, and 29.5% were non-families. 24.0% of all households were made up of individuals, and 11.4% had someone living alone who was 65 years of age or older. The average household size was 2.42 and the average family size was 2.84.

In the CDP, the population was spread out, with 24.7% under the age of 18, 5.8% from 18 to 24, 26.5% from 25 to 44, 21.5% from 45 to 64, and 21.4% who were 65 years of age or older. The median age was 40 years. For every 100 females, there were 92.1 males. For every 100 females age 18 and over, there were 90.1 males.

The median income for a household in the CDP was $33,310, and the median income for a family was $36,922. Males had a median income of $29,750 versus $21,270 for females. The per capita income for the CDP was $15,025. About 10.3% of families and 12.8% of the population were below the poverty line, including 16.6% of those under age 18 and 5.4% of those age 65 or over.
