= Great Cats World Park =

- Interactive map of Great Cats World Park
- Date opened: May, 2005
- Location: Cave Junction, Oregon, United States
- Land area: 45 Acres
- No. of animals: 90+
- No. of species: 30+
- Annual visitors: 150,000
- Management: 11 Staff / 28 Volunteers
- Website: greatcatspark.org

Great Cats World Park is a non-profit, accredited animal sanctuary that rescues exotic cats from roadside attractions, circuses, and neglect, and provides lifetime care to the most complete collection of felids in North America. The park is located near Cave Junction, Oregon, United States.

== Animals ==
Great Cats World Park is home to a collection of over 90 exotic cats and rescued hybrid species, such as ligers, tigons, tiligers, liligers, and jaglions. Some such species are not in captivity elsewhere in the United States and nearly all are non-releasable. The collection represents the most complete collection of cat species in North America.

The park additionally houses giraffes, porcupines, sloths, otters, zebras and a variety of exotic birds.

== History ==
Aerial View Prior To Expansion

Animal Resident

Great Cats World Park was built on a 45-acre lot bordering the Redwood Highway. The land was purchased in 2003, and the facility opened to the public in 2005. The facility is licensed by the USDA and ODA, and is fully accredited. The park sees over 150,000 visitors annually and participates in regulated species survival programs.

=== U.S. Fish and Wildlife Service probation ===
In September 2007, Great Cats World Park was sentenced by a federal court to one month probation for violation of the Endangered Species Act and fined $10,000. Owner Craig Wagner pleaded guilty in June 2007 to purchasing the park's ocelot for $3,000. There is a near-total ban on ocelot sales in order to discourage the commercialization of the rare animals. The ocelot was purchased from the Isis Society for Inspirational Studies, who were given two years probation and fined $60,000. The ocelot will continue to live at Great Cats World Park. According to Phil Land, the resident U.S. Fish and Wildlife agent in charge, "Sometimes it's actually better to leave them with the people that care for them. Then we don't have to try to find a place for them."

=== Safety incidents ===
In 2016, a park employee was hospitalized after being bitten in the arm by one of the tigers at the facility. A United States Department of Agriculture spokesperson confirmed that federal complaints against the facility had been filed after four reports of animal bites over the years.

== See also ==
- List of companies based in Oregon
