= Grave Creek (Oregon) =

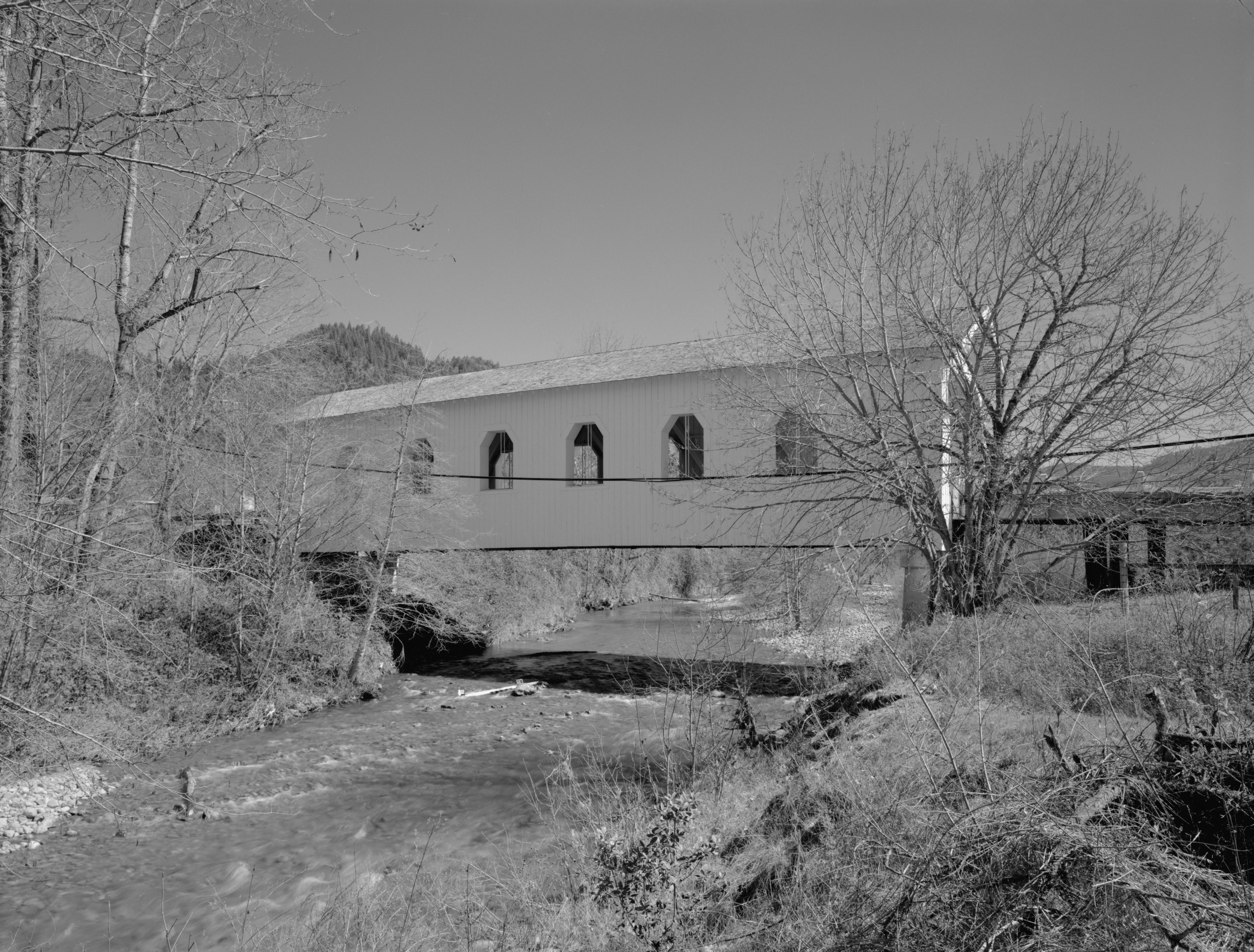
- Grave Creek Bridge carries Sunny Valley Loop Road over the creek.

- Location of the mouth of Grave Creek in Oregon
- Etymology: The grave of a child, Martha Leland Crowley, who died near the creek in 1846

Location
- Country: United States
- State: Oregon
- County: Douglas, Jackson, and Josephine

Physical characteristics
- Source: Cedar Springs Mountain
  - location: Klamath Mountains, Douglas County, Oregon
  - coordinates: 42°45′26″N 123°07′41″W
  - elevation: 4,556 ft (1,389 m)
- Mouth: Rogue River
  - location: about 5 miles (8.0 km) north of Galice, Josephine County, Oregon
  - coordinates: 42°38′54″N 123°35′05″W
  - elevation: 623 ft (190 m)
- Basin size: 163 sq mi (420 km^{2})
- Discharge
  - location: near Placer
  - average: 132 cu ft/s (3.7 m^{3}/s)
  - minimum: 1 cu ft/s (0.028 m^{3}/s)
  - maximum: 8,000 cu ft/s (230 m^{3}/s)

Grave Creek is a tributary, about 40 miles (64 km) long, of the Rogue River in southwestern Oregon in the United States.

== Course ==
The creek begins near Cedar Springs Mountain just north of the Douglas County – Jackson County border and flows generally southwest through Jackson County and Josephine County to its confluence with the Rogue. It passes through the communities of Placer, Sunny Valley, and Leland.

Named tributaries from source to mouth are Panther, Swamp, Last Chance, Big Boulder, Little Boulder, Slate, and Baker, Boulder, and Clark creeks followed by Eastman and Quartz Mill gulches. Then comes Tom East Creek followed by Benjamin Gulch, Shanks Creek, Schoolhouse Gulch, and Salmon Creek.

Further downstream are Rat Creek, Mackin Gulch, and Dog Creek, then Flume, Brimstone, and Brushy gulches. Another Tom East Creek is next, followed by Wolf, Butte, Panther, Reservoir, Fall, Poorman, and McNabe creeks. The final three tributaries are McNair, Rock, and Reuben creeks.

== Watershed ==
The Grave Creek watershed is about 20 miles (32 km) north of Grants Pass in the Klamath Mountains. It covers about 104,000 acres (42,000 ha) of which the federal Bureau of Land Management administers about 50,000 acres (20,000 ha) (48 percent). Federal and non-federal lands are intermingled in a checkerboard pattern. Annual precipitation averages about 45 inches (110 cm). Drought is common in summer.

== Recreation ==
Hiking trails and river runs converge at the confluence of Grave Creek and the Rogue River. Boaters sometimes run the lower 6 miles (10 km) of Grave Creek when its flow is 500 to 1,000 cubic feet per second (14 to 28 m^{3}/s). The run, rated class 3 on the International Scale of River Difficulty, has "short twisting blind drops on the section not visible from the road" and possible hazards that include low-hanging footbridges as well as brush along the stream banks. A handy stopping place for this run is the boat ramp near the Grave Creek Bridge over the Rogue River, which is the intersection of at Galice Road and Lower Graves Creek Road. (This is not the same bridge as the covered bridge, the Grave Creek Bridge, further upstream in Sunny Valley.)

The boat ramp is also popular with rafters and kayakers running the 40-mile (64 km) "wild" stretch of the Wild and Scenic lower Rogue, which begins at the mouth of Grave Creek. It is "one of the best-known whitewater runs in the United States." Parallel to the wild stretch of the river, the Lower Rogue River Trail winds through the Wild Rogue Wilderness between the mouth of Grave Creek and Illahe.

== See also ==
- List of rivers of Oregon

== Works cited ==
- Giordano, Pete (2004). Soggy Sneakers: A Paddler's Guide to Oregon's Rivers, fourth edition. Seattle: The Mountaineers Books. ISBN 978-0-89886-815-9.
- Sullivan, William L. (2002). Exploring Oregon's Wild Areas, third edition. Seattle: The Mountaineers Press. ISBN 0-89886-793-2.
