= Dryden, Oregon =

Unincorporated community in the state of Oregon, United States

- Unincorporated community
- Location within Oregon Location within the United States
- Coordinates: 42.269559°N 123.537287°W
- Country: United States
- State: Oregon
- County: Josephine
- Elevation: 1,434 ft (437 m)
- Time zone: UTC-8 (Pacific (PST))
  - Summer (DST): UTC-7 (PDT)
- Area codes: 458 and 541
- GNIS feature ID: 1141364

Dryden is an unincorporated community in Josephine County, Oregon, United States. It is located in the Deer Creek Valley about five miles east of Selma. As of 1990 only one house remained; the 1920 structure formerly served as the Dryden Store and post office.

== History ==
Dryden was named for English poet and playwright John Dryden by local pioneer J. P. Mills, who was an avid reader. Dryden post office was established in 1892; it closed in 1956. At one time Dryden also had a school.
