= Amos E. Voorhies =

American newspaper publisher (1869–1960)

Amos Earle Voorhies
- Voorhies c. 1900
- Born: June 6, 1869; Michigan, U.S.
- Died: October 27, 1960 (aged 91); Grants Pass, Oregon, U.S.
- Occupation: Newspaper publisher

Amos Earle Voorhies (June 6, 1869 – October 27, 1960) was an American newspaper publisher. Voorhies was born in Michigan and moved to Oregon in 1891 looking for work in the newspaper industry. He settled in Grants Pass, Oregon, in 1895, where he acquired the Rogue River Courier (later the Grants Pass Daily Courier), which he grew into an established daily newspaper.

== Biography ==
Amos Earle Voorhies was born near Greenville, Michigan, on June 6, 1869. As a young man, he worked as a grocery store clerk and later as an unpaid apprentice at the Greenville Independent. Voorhies moved to Oregon in 1891 looking for work in the newspaper industry. He found work at a number of printing offices in Portland, including a job at the Portland Sun before that periodical went out of business.

Voorhies moved to Grants Pass, Oregon, in 1895, where he assumed a job at the Oregon Observer. In 1897, Voorhies and C. S. Prince purchased the Rogue River Courier, a struggling weekly newspaper in Grants Pass. Voorhies became the sole owner of the paper after Prince pulled out of the partnership in 1899.

Voorhies was the sole publisher of the Courier from 1899 to 1947. The paper grew under his leadership, becoming a daily in 1910. The paper was renamed the Grants Pass Daily Courier in 1919. In later life Voorhies also became involved in radio, helping to establish the station KUIN (now KAGI).

Voorhies died in Grants Pass on October 27, 1960.

== Legacy ==
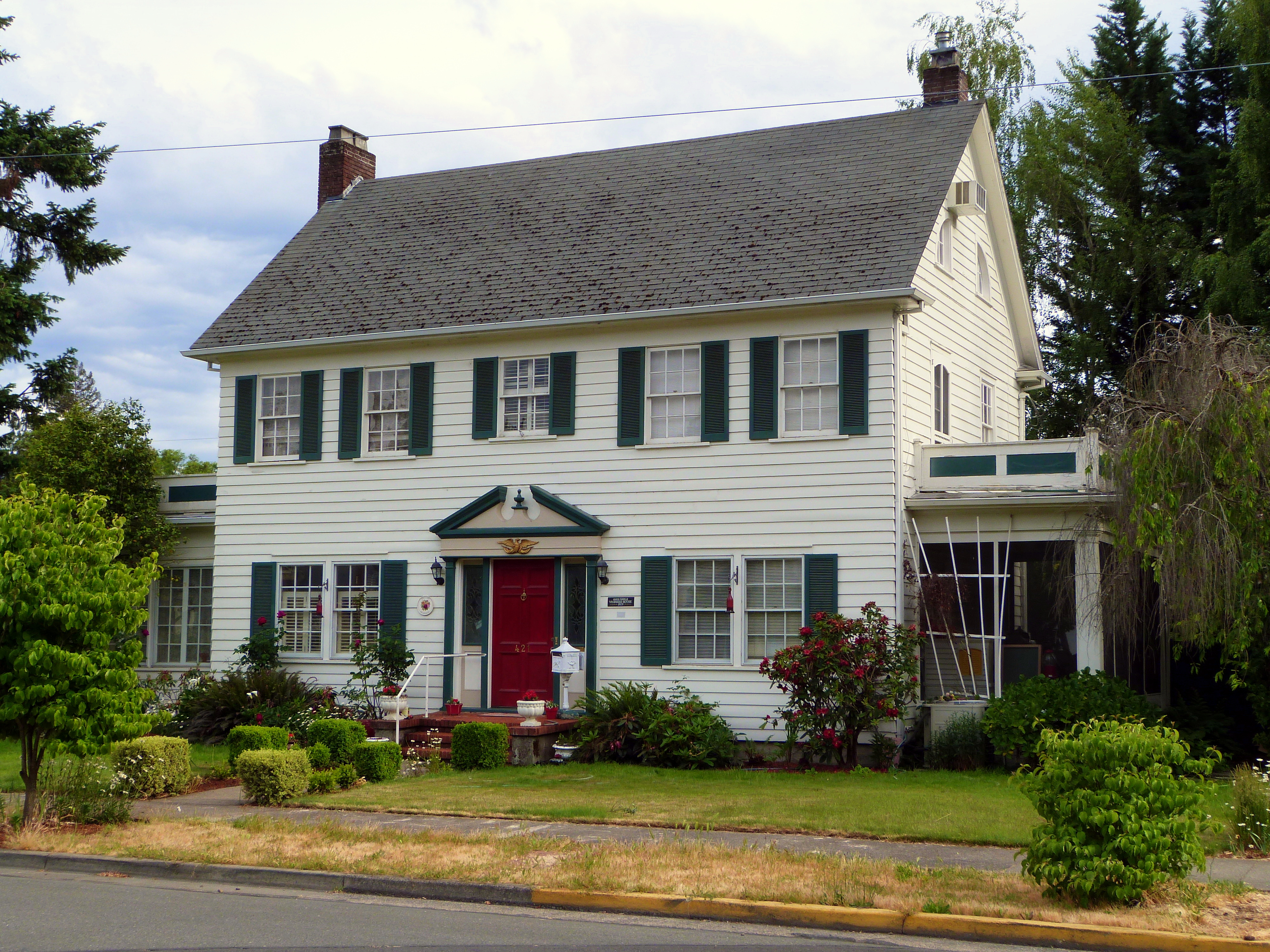
The Amos E. Voorhies House in Grants Pass is listed on the National Register of Historic Places.

The Oregon Newspaper Publishers Association presents the Amos E. Voorhies Award to honor outstanding journalistic achievement in Oregon.

In 1990, Voorhies's residence in Grants Pass was added to the National Register of Historic Places.

Many of Voorhies's glass plate negatives have been collected by retired history teacher and photographer Lloyd Smith. Oregon Public Broadcasting described the photographs as providing "a rare glimpse into everyday life in rural Southern Oregon".

== See also ==
- Journalism in Oregon
