= Illinois River Forks State Park =

State park in Oregon, United States

- Location within Oregon Location within the United States
- Type: Public, state
- Location: Josephine County, Oregon
- Nearest city: Cave Junction
- Coordinates: 42°09′24″N 123°39′29″W
- Operator: Oregon Parks and Recreation Department

Illinois River Forks State Park is a state park in the U.S. state of Oregon, administered by the Oregon Parks and Recreation Department. The park consists of approximately 400 acres, with 170 located between the forks of the Illinois River and the remainder on the west side. The portion between the forks of the river and accessed from Highway 199 just south of Cave Junction, is developed with paved parking, grass lawns with picnic tables, outhouses, and offers a wonderful swimming hole for summer users. The west side of the park, accessed from Westside Road, offers the West Side Trailhead and nearly seven miles of single-track, natural surface hiking and equestrian trails. There is gravelled parking for cars, and a separate pull-through parking lane area for horse rigs. A vault toilet and kiosk with the trail system displayed is in the parking area.

== See also ==
- List of Oregon state parks
