= Sunny Valley, Oregon =

Unincorporated community in the state of Oregon, United States

- Unincorporated community
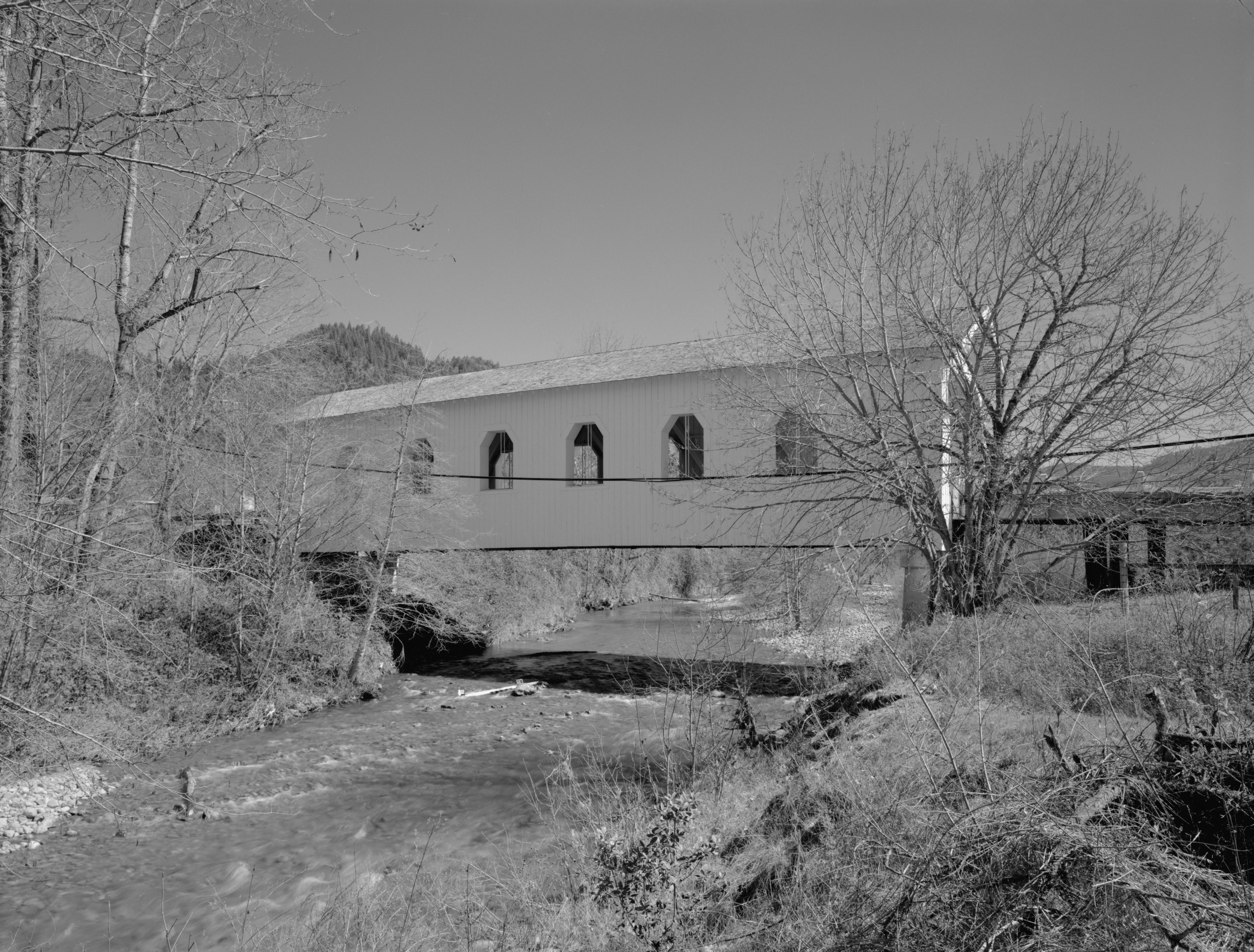
- Grave Creek Bridge in Sunny Valley

- Location within Oregon Location within the United States
- Coordinates: 42°38′20″N 123°22′32″W
- Country: United States
- State: Oregon
- County: Josephine
- Elevation: 1,260 ft (380 m)
- Time zone: UTC-8 (Pacific (PST))
  - Summer (DST): UTC-7 (PDT)
- ZIP codes: 97497

Sunny Valley is an unincorporated community in Josephine County, Oregon, United States. Sunny Valley lies just east of exit number 71, the Sunny Valley exit, on Interstate 5.

Grave Creek, a tributary of the Rogue River, flows through Sunny Valley. Grave Creek Bridge, a covered bridge, carries Sunny Valley Loop Road over the creek.
