= Murphy, Oregon =

Unincorporated community in the state of Oregon, United States

- Unincorporated Community
- Location within Oregon Location within the United States
- Coordinates: 42°20′51″N 123°20′00″W
- Country: United States
- State: Oregon
- County: Josephine
- Elevation: 1,063 ft (324 m)
- Time zone: UTC-8 (Pacific)
  - Summer (DST): UTC-7 (Pacific)
- ZIP code: 97533
- Area code: 541
- GNIS feature ID: 1146674

Murphy is an unincorporated community in Josephine County, Oregon, United States. The Three Rivers School District is located there.

Although Murphy is unincorporated, it has a post office with the ZIP code 97533.

The first industrial hemp crop in the state was planted near Murphy. In September 2015, deer ate over 900 of the 1,000 plants.
