= New Hope, Oregon =

Unincorporated community in the state of Oregon, United States

- Census-designated place
- Location within Oregon Location within the United States
- Coordinates: 42.362°N 123.368°W
- Country: United States
- State: Oregon
- County: Josephine

Area
  - Total: 3.83 sq mi (9.91 km^{2})
  - Land: 3.83 sq mi (9.91 km^{2})
  - Water: 0 sq mi (0.00 km^{2})
- Elevation: 1,040 ft (320 m)

Population (2020)
  - Total: 1,572
  - Density: 410.6/sq mi (158.55/km^{2})
- Time zone: UTC-8 (Pacific (PST))
  - Summer (DST): UTC-7 (PDT)
- ZIP code: 97527
- Area codes: 458 and 541
- FIPS code: 41-52275
- GNIS feature ID: 1146811

New Hope is an unincorporated community and census-designated place (CDP) in Josephine County, Oregon, United States. As of the 2020 census, New Hope had a population of 1,572.

== Geography ==
New Hope is in eastern Josephine County, 6 miles (10 km) south of Grants Pass, the county seat. The community lies just north of the Applegate River, a northwest-flowing tributary of the Rogue River.

According to the U.S. Census Bureau, the New Hope CDP has an area of 3.8 square miles (9.9 km^{2}), all of it recorded as land.

== Demographics ==
Historical population
Census	Pop.	Note	%±
2020	1,572		—
U.S. Decennial Census
