= Grants Pass Daily Courier =

Daily newspaper published in Grants Pass, Oregon

- Type: Daily newspaper
- Format: Broadsheet
- Owner: Courier Publishing Company
- Founder: John A. Stine
- Publisher: Travis Moore
- President: Sylvia Voorhies
- Editor: Scott Stoddard
- Founded: 1885
- Language: English
- Headquarters: Grants Pass, Oregon, U.S.
- Circulation: 11,383 Daily; 12,488 Sunday
- OCLC number: 37297316
- Website: thedailycourier.com

The Grants Pass Daily Courier is an independent, family-owned daily newspaper published in Grants Pass, Oregon, United States. The Daily Courier covers Grants Pass and the surrounding area and is delivered throughout Josephine County, as well as parts of Jackson and Douglas counties. It was established in 1885 and is owned by Courier Publishing Company. The Daily Courier is an evening paper published Tuesday through Friday and Sunday and had a circulation around 9,200 as of 2023.

The Daily Courier is the oldest continuously published newspaper in Southern Oregon. It took the title in 2019 when the Ashland Daily Tidings closed.

== History ==
In 1885, John H. Stine established a weekly newspaper called the Grant's Pass Courier. A few years earlier Stine had founded the Heppner Gazette. In 1886, the paper's name was changed to the Rogue River Courier. Around that time Stine sold a half-interest to W. J. Wimer. Ownership continued to change rapidly in the paper's early years. Other publishers were A. A. Allworth (1887), Frank T. Sheppard (1888), George Hoskins Currey (1889) and J. Nunan (1890).

It was at the end of Nunan's tenure that C. S. Price and Amos Earle Voorhies took charge as partners on July 1, 1897. Much of the success of the paper in its first few decades has been attributed to Voorhies, its longtime publisher. He bought out Price after two years and operated the paper for six decades. Under him, the Courier was one of the first small-town papers in Oregon to install a type-casting machine, an engraving plant and a teletypesetter.

The paper briefly published a daily bulletin in 1898 during the Spanish American War, and established regular daily publication schedule in 1910. When the Courier became a daily, Grants Pass was the smallest city in the world to have leased wire service from the United Press. In 1919, the paper's name was changed again to the Grants Pass Daily Courier so to avoid confusion after the town of Woodville was renamed to Rogue River.

In 1960, Voorhies died at age 91. The Oregon Newspaper Publishers Association named an award after him given annually to the journalist who contributed the most to the profession in the state. From there, his son Earle E. Voorhies and grandson John Voorhies became co-publishers until 1971 when Earle died. John Voorhies remodeled and enlarged the plant. Over the years he refused offers to sell out to larger chains and took pride in the paper being family owned. In 2016, John Voorhies died and the paper continued to remain in his family.

When the Medford Mail-Tribune suddenly closed on January 13, 2023, the Daily Courier said it hoped to expand its coverage area to fill the gap. Around that time Josephine County commissioners voted to pull legal notices from the Courier and switch to the smaller Illinois Valley News. A month later the paper announced it had agreed to have 60 years of its archive being digitized and made available for free online via the Oregon Digital Newspaper Program at the University of Oregon.

== Awards ==
The Daily Courier received the 2018 Baker Public Service Award from the Oregon Newspaper Publishers Association for its coverage of the Taylor Creek and Klondike wildfires. Reporters for the Daily Courier won the Bruce Baer Award for Oregon journalism in 1988 and 1992, as well as a special recognition in 1987.
