= Pleasant Valley, Josephine County, Oregon =

Unincorporated community in the state of Oregon, United States

Coordinates: 42.557062°N 123.385896°W

Pleasant Valley is an unincorporated community in Josephine County, Oregon, United States. It is lies about 11 miles (18 km) north of Grants Pass, just west of Interstate 5. Situated along the historic Applegate Trail, the community is home to a pioneer cemetery and once had a school.
