= Foris Vineyards Winery =

American winery located in Oregon

Coordinates: 42°7′10.35″N 123°32′59.89″W

Foris Vineyards Winery is an American winery located near Cave Junction, Oregon in the Illinois Valley region of the Rogue Valley AVA of Southern Oregon. As one of Oregon's pioneering grape growers, Ted Gerber planted his first vineyard in 1974. For 15 years, Gerber provided fruit to other winemakers, until 1986 when the winery was founded by Ted and Meri Gerber and the Foris label was launched.

In 2000, Ted and Meri Gerber received the Oregon Winery Association's Founders Award for their contribution to the industry. Over the years, the Gerber's have been partners in many projects conducted by Oregon State University and United States Department of Agriculture.

Foris is one of Oregon's most consistent producers specializing in Pinot Noir, and Alsace varietal white wines- Pinot Gris, Pinot Blanc, Gewurztraminer, Riesling, and Muscat. Gerber was among the first to recognize that the Dijon clones of Chardonnay and Pinot Noir offered considerable opportunity for blending and complexity. His Dijon clone propagation program supplied several top California wineries with grafted wood.

== History ==
While Foris turns out a variety of wines and has been known for years for producing excellent Gewurztraminer, Chardonnay, Pinot Noir, Pinot Blanc, and other cool climate varietals, Armed with meteorological data going back 30 years, Gerber and his late wife, Meri, purchased their first 15 acres near the old, abandoned mining town of Holland in the hills above Cave Junction in 1971. At the time, the Gerber's were as much pioneers down south as the Letts, Eraths, Adelsheims, and Ponzi's were up north. In 1990, he hired Sarah Powell a French-trained winemaker who focused on low yields and quality fruit. Foris began producing Pinot Noir and launched marketing their wines to states outside of Oregon. Powell's success was particularly noted when Foris 1994 Maple Ranch Pinot Noir was served at a White House dinner in 1997. Powell left Foris in 2001 to pursue a consulting career. Eventually Gerber invited Bryan Wilson to join Foris and he became winemaker in 2007, bringing a new vibrancy to Foris wines. Wilson's working background included winemaking at Stags Leap Wine Cellars in Napa, Benziger Family Winery in Sonoma and Sylvan Ridge near Eugene Oregon. Foris is known for their Gewürztraminer, Chardonnay, Pinot noir and Merlot and had its 2006 Pinot Blanc voted "Best of Show" at the World of Wine Festival near Gold Hill, Oregon. They also produce Foris Cave Bear Red, the sale of which is used to support the Oregon Caves Chateau renovation.

== Vineyards ==
Foris has 145 estate planted acres of vineyards. The high elevation in the Illinois Valley, 1,200 to 1,800 feet, results in a short growing season. annual rainfall within the region is approximately 60 inches. Winters are cold and wet. Springs are warm and usually dry. Summers are dry and hot. The elevation and close proximity to the Pacific Ocean, defines a location well suited for cool climate varieties such as Pinot Noir and Alsace varietal white wines- Pinot Gris, Pinot Blanc, Gewurztraminer, Riesling, and Muscat. All estate vineyards are within three miles of each other and the winery.

== Wines ==
In 2013, Foris produced 45,000 cases of wine and ranked #13 for Top Oregon Wineries by Total Production. Approximately 22,500 cases in 2013 were produced for the Foris label, positioning Foris #20 for Top Oregon Wineries by Brand/Label. Varietals featured under the Foris label are estate grown Pinot Noir, Pinot Gris, Pinot Blanc, Gewurztraminer, Riesling, and Moscato as well as their single vineyard Maple Ranch Pinot Noir. The wines are distributed in 38 states, the District of Columbia, and Japan. Foris also produces Cabernet Sauvignon, Cabernet Franc, and Merlot as well as the famous "Fly Over Red"- a blend of Bordeaux varietals with the fruit sourced from several vineyards in the Rogue Valley.

== Ownership ==
Foris was founded by Ted and Meri Gerber. In 1971, they began studying Oregon's climate over the past 30 years and decided that the weather and soil in Oregon could grow quality grapes. They purchased 15 acres (61,000 m^{2}) near the former gold mining town of Holland and added 80 acres (320,000 m^{2}) more in 1975 in what is now the site of Gerber Ranch and Foris Winery. The early years saw failed crops and the wrong grapes planted in the wrong areas. Changes in the wine market also forced various adjustments over the years. By 2006, Foris' crops had proved that the Illinois Valley is a viable place to grow grapes.

In 2007, Foris Winery produced 48,000 cases of wine, making it the 14th-largest bonded winery in Oregon.
