= Bridgeview, Nova Scotia =

Coordinates: 44°40′15″N 63°39′18.9″W

Bridgeview is a Residential subdivision, developed by B.D (Burnett David) Stevens in the 1960s. Located in the community of Rockingham on Mainland Halifax, just off the Bedford Highway, it is considered to be part of the Halifax Regional Municipality, Nova Scotia, and is found on the shore of the Bedford Basin in Halifax Harbour.

BD Stevens, known as one of the greatest church builders in Atlantic Canada, that inspired the writing of a book entitled “The Man Who Built Churches”, and a developer responsible for several subdivisions throughout Halifax, seemed to have a fondness for Bridgeview, having built homes for the majority of his adult children to live in this neighbourhood - Laurie Stevens (Marilyn), Jean Pierce (Arden), Audrey Keeping (Clyde), Elsie Lewis (Lou), and Shelia Munro (John).

“Birdland”, as it was affectionately called by its residents in the 1970s and 1980s, acquired this nickname as all of streets were named after birds - Flamingo Drive, Kingfisher Crescent, Dove Street, Canary Crescent, Nightingale Drive, Swan Crescent, Skylark Street, to name a few.

Flamingo Drive, the main road of the subdivision, is 1.54km in length and runs from the Bedford Highway winding its way up the hill to what used to be a dead end, a wooded area leading to a path commonly known as the “buggy trail”. This has since been developed and is now the Residential subdivision, Knightsridge, which connects Bridgeview subdivision to the Dunbruck Highway.

D.J. Butler Park, sometimes referred to as “Bridgeview Park”, is found at the top of Flamingo Drive. What once held a baseball field (home to the Bridgeview Pirates, a Sobeys sponsored little league baseball team), a tennis court, basketball court and playground, has since become a popular playground, basketball and tennis court.

In the 1970s and early 1980s, Bridgeview was also home to CJCH radio broadcaster and politician, Gerald “ Jer Bear” Lawrence.

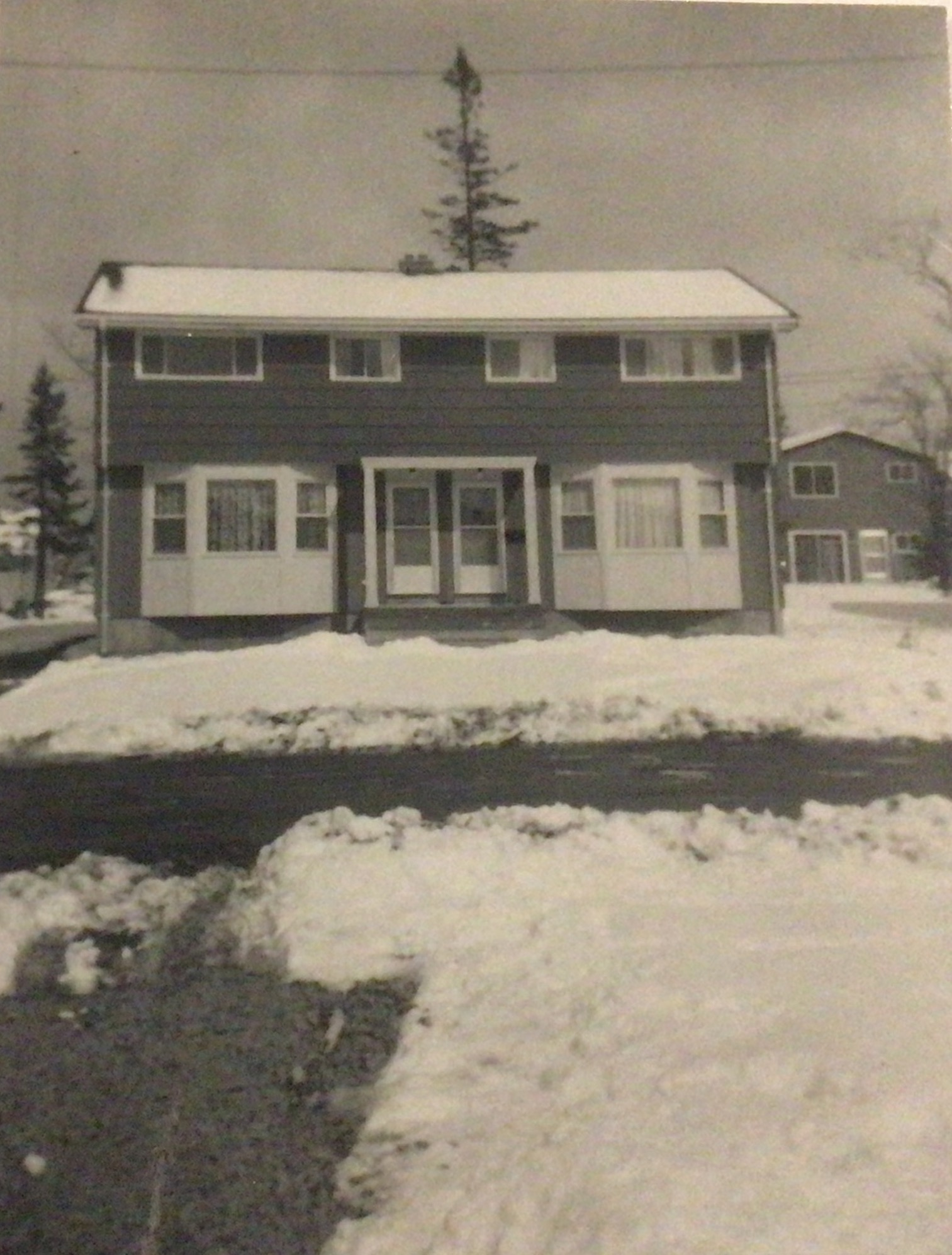
33 and 31 Kingfisher Crescent, Bridgeview Nova Scotia
