= Greenback, Oregon =

Unincorporated community in the state of Oregon, United States

- Unincorporated community
- Location within Oregon Greenback (the United States)
- Coordinates: 42°39′9″N 123°18′43″W
- Country: United States
- State: Oregon
- County: Josephine
- Established: 1902
- Elevation: 1,903 ft (580 m)
- Time zone: UTC-8 (Pacific (PST))
  - Summer (DST): UTC-7 (PDT)
- ZIP codes: 97497
- GNIS feature ID: 1134142

Greenback is a ghost town and former mining town in Josephine County, Oregon.

== History ==
Greenback was named for the nearby Greenback Mine, a gold and quartz mine which was once the richest mine in Oregon by feet of tunnel mined. The Greenback Mine was established by Len Browning and Edward Hanum in 1897. It was sold to banker William Brevoot in 1902, and he founded the town. The post office was established in August 1902 and disestablished in June 1908. Carey W. Thompson was the first postmaster.
