= Leland, Oregon =

Unincorporated community in the state of Oregon, United States

- Unincorporated community
- Location within Oregon Location within the United States
- Coordinates: 42.638°N 123.441°W
- Country: United States
- State: Oregon
- County: Josephine
- Elevation: 1,086 ft (331 m)
- Time zone: UTC-8 (Pacific (PST))
  - Summer (DST): UTC-7 (PDT)
- ZIP code: 97497
- Area codes: 458 and 541

Leland is an unincorporated community in Josephine County, Oregon, United States. It lies in the Klamath Mountains along Grave Creek, a tributary of the Rogue River.

A post office was established in 1855 and McDonough Harkness was its first postmaster. A railroad was also built in the area and the station of Altamont, with a post office founded by Ben Parker that operated from 1884 to 1886. Altamont then became Leland in 1888, and Leland's post office was moved to the station, where it closed in 1943.
