= Bridgeview Vineyard and Winery =

Wine estate located in Oregon

Coordinates: 42.125537°N 123.594002°W

- Location: Cave Junction, Oregon, USA
- Founded: 1986
- First vintage: 1987
- Key people: All
- Cases/yr: N/A
- Varietals: Pinot noir, Chardonnay, Merlot, Pinot Gris, Riesling, Cabernet Sauvignon, Gewürztraminer, Müller Thurgau, Muscat (grape and wine)
- Distribution: national
- Tasting: open to the public
- Website: http://www.bridgeviewwine.com/

Bridgeview Vineyard and Winery is one of the largest wineries in Oregon. It is located in Cave Junction, Oregon. Its 85-acre (340,000 m^{2}) estate in the Illinois Valley is planted in the European style of dense six-foot row and four-foot vine spacing. Bridgeview also has an 80-acre (320,000 m^{2}) vineyard in the Applegate Valley.

== History ==
Bridgeview produces low to mid-market wines in the varietals of Chardonnay, Gewürztraminer, Muscat, Pinot Gris, Pinot Noir, and Riesling. Bridgeview is most famous for its line of "Blue Moon" Riesling, Chardonnay, and Pinot Noir. Other lines include Black Beauty Merlot and a Premium line that includes Reserve Pinot Gris and Reserve Pinot Noir.

Bob and Lelo Eichmann co run the business. René Eichmann serves as Vice President and winemaker.

Bridgeview introduced blue bottles for their "Blue Moon" Riesling and "Blue Moon" Chardonnay, and by using colored, recyclable synthetic corks in some of their bottles.

== Blue Moon Riesling ==
A bottle of Bridgeview's Blue Moon Riesling, and a close up of its label.

Brideview’s Blue Moon Riesling comes in a cobalt blue bottle, that according to Frank J. Prial of The New York Times is an instant attention grabber. The cork is made from the same material used in artificial heart valves, has a brand name of Supremecorq, and is also cobalt blue. Wine Enthusiast Magazine noted the "edgieness" of the bottle while recommending Bridgeview's 2002 Blue Moon Riesling, giving it a score of 87.
