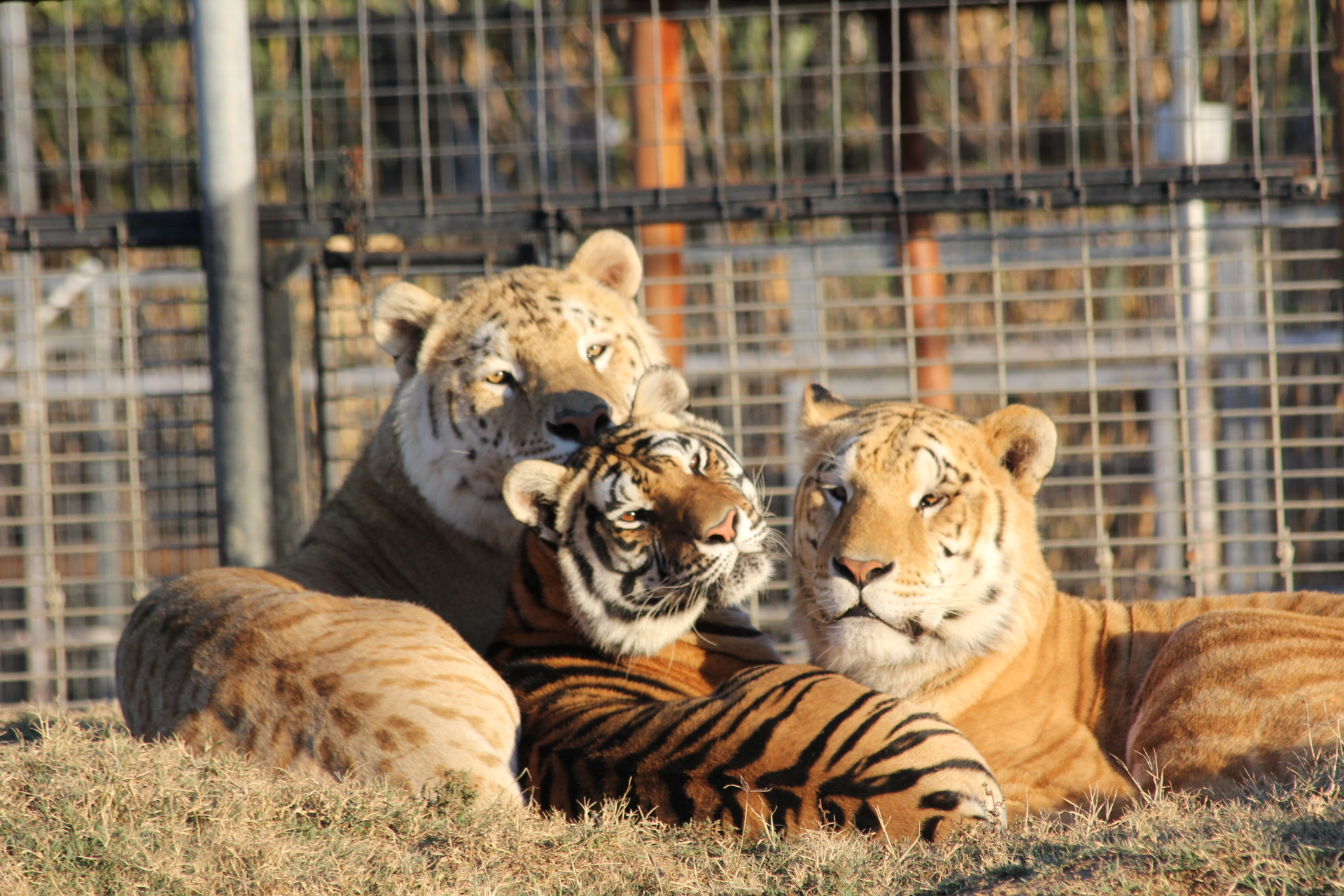
- World's first tiliger at G.W. Zoo

Scientific classification
- Kingdom: Animalia
- Phylum: Chordata
- Class: Mammalia
- Order: Carnivora
- Family: Felidae
- Subfamily: Pantherinae
- Genus: Panthera
- Species: P. tigris♂ × P. leo♂ × P. tigris♀♀

= Tiliger =

Offspring of a male tiger and a ligress

A tiliger or taliger is a second generation hybrid from a male tiger (Panthera tigris) and a ligress (which is the hybrid offspring of a lion and a tigress). The world's first tiligers were born on 16 August 2007 at Greater Wynnewood Exotic Animal Park in Wynnewood, Oklahoma.

Although male ligers and tigons are sterile, female ligers and tigons can produce cubs. As with ligers, tiligers grow to a size that is typically larger than either of their lion and tiger forebears. Large males can grow 300 kg up to 400 kg and total length 3,8 meters in length, while the females may grow weight 200 kg up to 250 kg and up to 3,2 meters in length.

== History ==
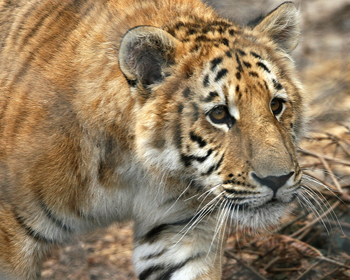
Tiliger cross of (Panthera leo x Panthera tigris) x Panthera tigris at Tigerworld Animal Sanctuary, North Carolina

In the first litter of tiligers, the sire - Kahun - was a white Bengal tiger (Panthera tigris tigris) and the dam - Beauty - was a liger. Five cubs were born to that litter - four male and one female - named Tanyaro, Yun Yi, Monique, and two others that were moved to other facilities.

On 7 March 2013, a second set of tiliger cubs were again born at Greater Wynnewood Exotic Animal Park. In this event, the sire - Noah - was a Siberian tiger (Panthera tigris altaica) and the dam - Lizzy - was a liger. Three cubs were born to that litter.

Valley of the Kings in Sharon, Wisconsin is home to a female tiliger named Ti-ler.

In 2008 a tiliger named Radar was born in Florida and was transferred to Tigerworld Animal Sanctuary in Rockwell, North Carolina at 15 weeks old. Radar's parents are a male tiger and a female liger.
