= Illinois Valley News =

Weekly newspaper published in Cave Junction, Oregon

- "Your family. Your friends. Your news."
- Type: Weekly newspaper
- Owner(s): Daniel J. Mancuso and Laura Mancuso
- Founded: 1937
- Language: English
- Headquarters: 116 Redwood Hwy, Cave Junction, Oregon
- Circulation: 2,150
- ISSN: 2833-2520
- OCLC number: 34877588
- Website: theivnews.com

The Illinois Valley News is a weekly newspaper published in Josephine County in the U.S. state of Oregon. The paper is published in Cave Junction, Oregon, by Daniel J. Mancuso and Laura Mancuso. It had a circulation around 1,350 as of 2023.

== History ==
The Illinois Valley News was founded June 11, 1937 by the two brothers, L. E. and M. C. Athey. The brothers' first issue referred to the area as the Valley of Riches due to the abundant natural beauty and resources. In 1949 M. C. and Anna Athey sold the paper to Mr. and Mrs. J. C. Abernathy.

In 1955 the National Board of Fire Underwriters presented an award to the News for public service in the field of fire prevention and safety the previous year, primarily resulting from the efforts of former publishers Joan and Dick Pinkerton.

Mr. and Mrs. James M. McDermott were the publishers in the 1960. Bob and Helen Grant bought the paper in 1961; Bob's role as publisher lasted at least into the early 1970s. In the early 1960s, the paper was the first to advocate that the Collier Tunnel along U.S. Route 199 near the Oregon-California border, be named for U.S. Senator Randolph Collier of California, known as the "father of California's Freeways."

The paper was known as the Cave Junction Bulletin for a period including 1971.

Bob and Jan Rodriguez owned the paper from the mid-1980s to 2010, when they sold it to Daniel Mancuso and Kevan Moore. The paper's reporting has been cited in regional and national news outlets, such as coverage of a 1990 cold case reopened in 2014, and a Southern Oregon forest fire in 2002. A humorous ad run by the paper, soliciting reporters but warning of "low pay and marginal health insurance," was quoted in a 2010 Austin Examiner story about the challenges facing local newspapers. Publisher Mancuso was quoted in a 2014 Oregonian story, claiming that a lack of local law enforcement resources was contributing to challenges solving in a more recent criminal case.

== See also ==
- Illinois River (Oregon)
