= BridgeView (San Francisco) =

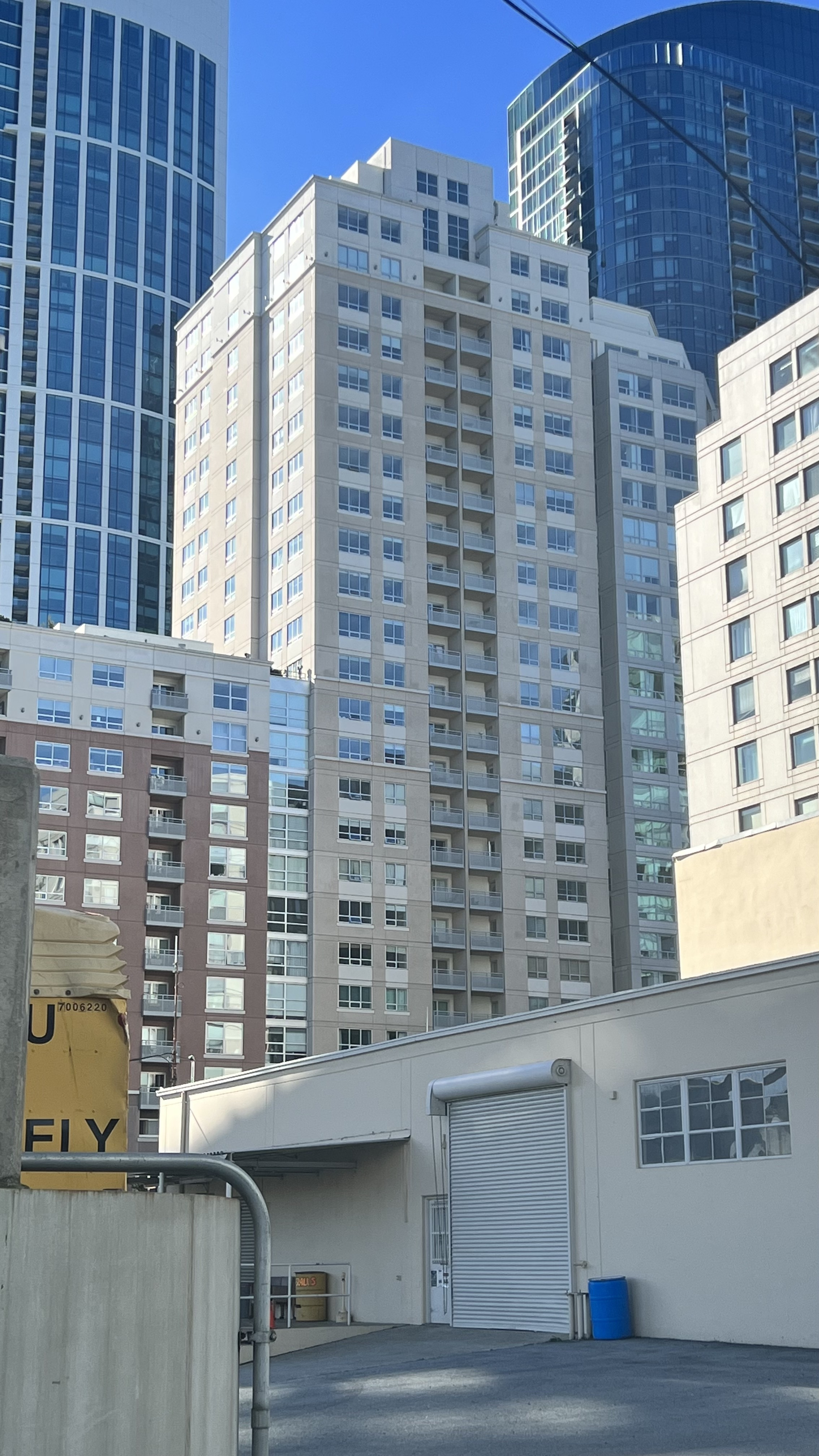
- View from Main Street (2022)

- Location within San Francisco BridgeView (San Francisco) (California) BridgeView (San Francisco) (the United States)
- Alternative names: 400 Beale Street

General information
- Status: Completed
- Type: Residential apartments
- Location: 400 Beale Street; San Francisco, California
- Coordinates: 37.786909°N 122.3918129°W
- Completed: 2002

Height
- Architectural: 333 ft (101 m)
- Roof: 333 ft (101 m)

Technical details
- Floor count: 26
- Floor area: 450,000 sq ft (42,000 m^{2})

Design and construction
- Architect: Christiani Johnson Architects

Other information
- Number of units: 245

BridgeView is a 333-foot (101 m) residential skyscraper in the Rincon Hill neighborhood of San Francisco, California. The tower has 245 residential units on 26 floors.

== See also ==
- List of tallest buildings in San Francisco
