= Bridge View Inn =

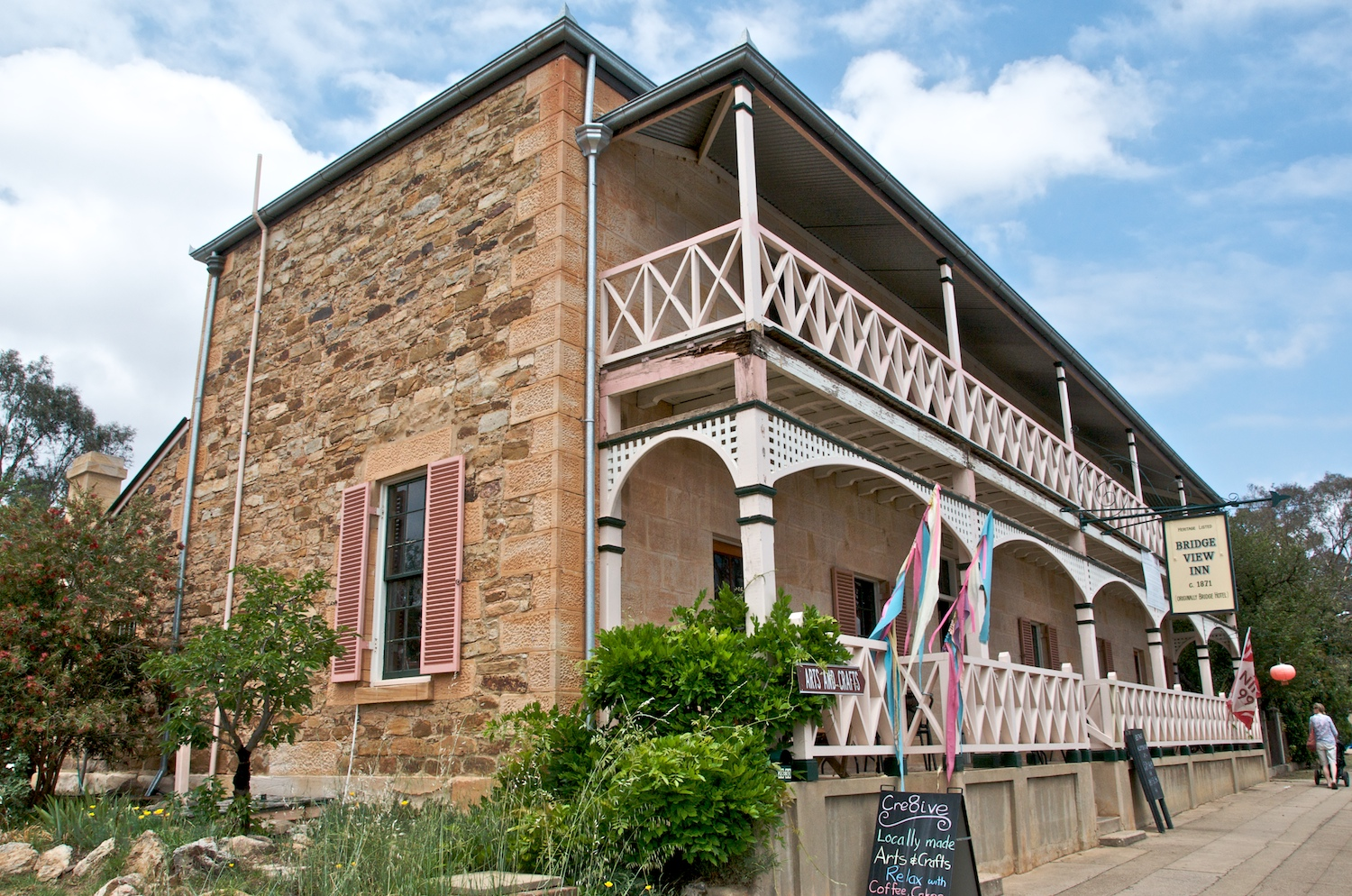

- Location within New South Wales Location within Australia
- 32.7953°S 149.9721°E
- Location: 28–30 Louee Street, Rylstone, Mid-Western Regional Council, New South Wales, Australia

History
- Built: 1860–1870

Site notes
- Owner: Rylstone and District Historical Society Incorporated

New South Wales Heritage Register
- Official name: Bridge View Inn; Bridge Restaurant; Bridge Hotel; Rylstone Historical Society Building; Bridgeview Inn
- Type: state heritage (built)
- Designated: 2 April 1999
- Reference no.: 438
- Type: Inn/Tavern
- Category: Commercial

Bridge View Inn is a heritage-listed former hotel and bank building which now contains bed and breakfast accommodation, a museum and commercial enterprises at 28–30 Louee Street, Rylstone, in the Central West region of New South Wales, Australia. It was built from 1860 to 1870. It is also known as Bridge Hotel, Rylstone Historical Society Building, and Bridgeview Inn. The property is owned by Rylstone and District Historical Society. It was added to the New South Wales State Heritage Register on 2 April 1999.

== History ==
In the early 1860s Goodwin Spires Hall and his family arrived in Rylstone, having previously spent some time on the Turon River goldfields near Sofala. Goodwin Spires Hall was an emancipist who had been transported into NSW as a convict in 1836 for manslaughter. He acquired land at the northern end of Louee Street where he built a number of cottages and a general store. The area became known as Halls Corner and two of his early Victorian cottages remain. His son later operated a newsagency, a fancy goods store, and a boot business in the corner buildings.

The building of the Bridge Hotel (as it was first known) in the late 1860s, on land south of the cottages, was one of Hall's major projects, and although the architect and builder are not known Purvis may have been involved. Purvis was an experienced stonemason in the town and had constructed a number of well-executed buildings in and around Rylstone at the time (such as the Dabee and Carwell homesteads) and also later the fine three-storey sandstone mill in Louee Street opposite the Bridge Inn. Apparently, the inn was so named because it faced the road bridge over the Cudgegong River at the end of Hall Street (the White Bridge, the second of four road bridges built in Rylstone).

The Bridgeview was one of four inns in the late 1860s in Rylstone; these were Walton's Colonial Inn (the oldest and formerly opposite the post office), Mr. Hayes' The Shamrock (formerly at the lower end of Mudgee Street), Mr. Owens' The Globe (south of the Bridge Hotel in Louee Street) and Hall's Bridge Hotel. Hall leased the business to various operators (Muir, Owen, Brown, Stollery and Crosley) from 1872 until the license lapsed in 1895.

When it closed as a hotel it was purchased by the Australian Joint Stock Bank. The bank had operated from small premises in Jackson's Building to the south in Louee Street since the early 1870s. The two rooms at the northern end of the building, formerly the bar, became the business office with the manager's office at the back. The rest of the ground floor and the entire upstairs areas were used as the manager's residence. The AJS Bank changed its name to the Australian Bank of Commerce in 1910 and subsequently amalgamated with the Bank of New South Wales in November 1931. At this time alterations were made to the southern end of the upstairs area.

In 1950 the bank manager moved to a residence in Mudgee Street and the clerk occupied the office residence. In 1957 when the new bank building in Louee Street was completed and a clerk's residence built beside the manager's, the Bridgeview Inn became vacant and was put up for sale. Alterations were made to the timber verandah posts and fencing which had remained intact when the street level had been lowered some years before. The new owner was the Kandos Cement Works' accountant, Mr Fink. He intended to reside there upon his retirement from the works. However, his plans were never realised due to his premature death.

The building was leased to the Rylstone Historical Society and they sub-let the upper residence retaining only the two downstairs rooms, the dining room, and the early separate kitchen at the rear. The local solicitor John Knox used the office and residence for a time until his own home was built and subsequently retained the office. After the death of Mr Fink, the building was again put up for sale and as there were concerns about its future the Society secured a housing loan and purchased the property in 1967.

In 1978 the building was used as the set for the significant Australian film Thomas Keneally's book "The Chant of Jimmie Blacksmith" directed by Fred Schepisi. The bar in particular was "restored" for this production. In 1981 further conservation of the building was assisted by two grants from the National Estate Program additionally a loan was granted to the lessee to assist in the establishment of a business. As one of the conditions of the loan a Permanent Conservation Order was placed over the building in 1986 following a recommendation of the NSW Heritage Council. The PCO listing was transformed into a State Heritage Register listing on 2 April 1999.

A historic mural was uncovered in the dining room in the 1980s, which was further investigated and conserved by the historical society in 2010 Over the years the society tried to establish a number of restaurant ventures with different tenants to recoup maintenance costs with varying degrees of success. In 1988, the society relocated the Showground cottage that had been threatened with demolition to make way for a new amenities building. The early 20th-century weatherboard cottage was originally a four-roomed building with a timber verandah. Since the inn had been let in the restaurant venture the cottage provided avenue for meetings, display space, and storage of furniture. In 2018 the Bridgeview Inn is used for tourism purposes, with various local businesses leasing parts of the building offering accommodation, food, and shopping.

== Description ==
The Bridgeview Inn is one of several stone buildings which together give Rylstone much of its aesthetic appeal. It is an important townscape element. The building, dating from the 1860s, is double storey and with a steep, hipped iron roof, constructed of stone-dressed sandstone to the facade and random rubble to the other walls. There is a two-storey verandah facing Louee Street. This has timber posts, moldings, and lattice infill to the archways between the posts; the upper balustrade is cross-braced. Windows are twelve panes and have shutters. A skillion section runs along the rear of the building. The interior includes high-ceilinged rooms and several narrow hallways with steep stairways and cedar joinery.

The Dining Room contains the rare 1860s mural that has recently been uncovered and conserved. Behind the inn building is a small detached rubble-stone building made partly of stone and partly of sandstone brick which was probably the original kitchen. There are recently built public toilets at the northern end of this outbuilding.

There is the early 20th-century weatherboard "Showground cottage" which had been threatened with demolition and was relocated to the rear of this property by the society in 1988. This operates as a local museum and houses the collection of the society.

There is also a rustic timber pole shed and an open grassland car park area beside the inn.

The building was reported to be in good condition as at 31 January 2014.

=== Modifications and dates ===
- 1860s: hotel built
- 1895–1937: Bank use and residential use – involved minor modifications including changes to southern end of the upstairs areas in 1931.
- 1967–1981: Used as a museum to house the collection of the Rylstone & District Historical Society. Conservation works during this time included repair work to the dining room, structural stonework repairs to the main building and the early kitchen, roof guttering, stormwater system, some internal works and the mains electrical supply. The upstairs residence was refurbished with the addition of a small self-contained kitchen
- 1981: Converted for use as a restaurant - involved minor modifications.
- 1988: The Rylstone and District Historical Society relocated a weatherboard cottage dating from early 20th century from the showground where it was threatened with demolition to the rear of the Bridgeview Inn property
- 2009: Australian Government funding to allow professional conservation advice on mural in dining room (ICS report) (grant application, 2011).
- 2004–05: Australian Government CHHP funding $62,000 for repair works.
- 2011: Heritage Division grant to restore rare 1860s mural in dining room.

== Heritage listing ==
An early commercial building of substantial scale, it forms an integral element of the local townscape alongside other stone buildings that contribute to the village's architectural character.

The historic Bridge View Inn at Rylstone in the state's Central Tablelands was built in the 1860s and has been used variously as a hotel, bank, solicitor's office, residence, museum, restaurant and bed and breakfast accommodation.

Bridge View Inn was listed on the New South Wales State Heritage Register on 2 April 1999.
