= Josephine County, Oregon =

County in Oregon, United States

- County
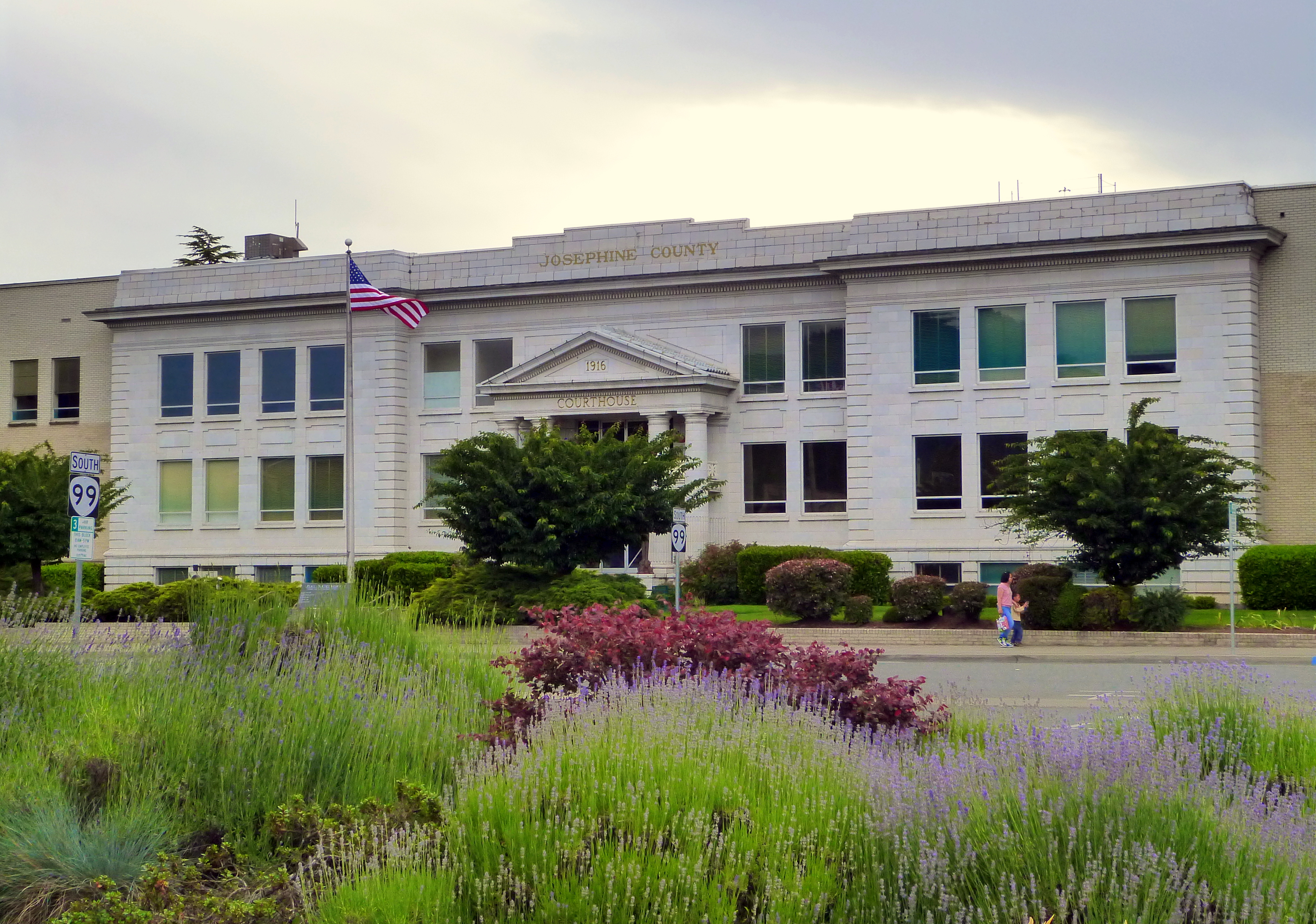
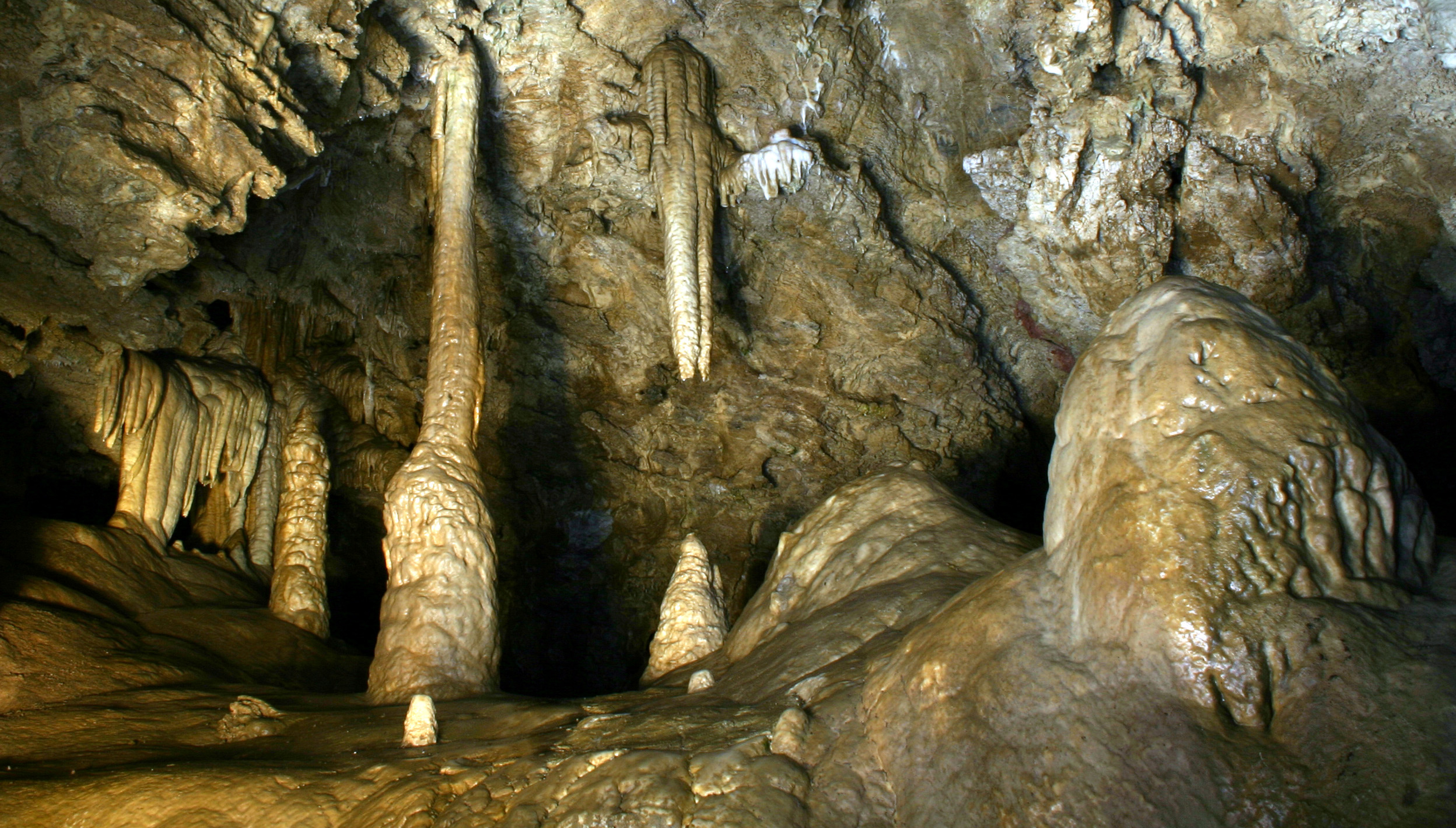
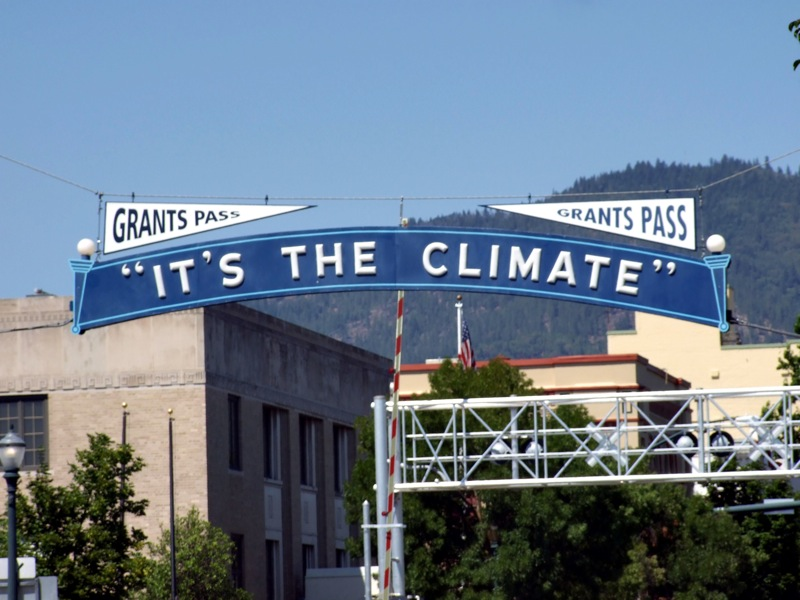
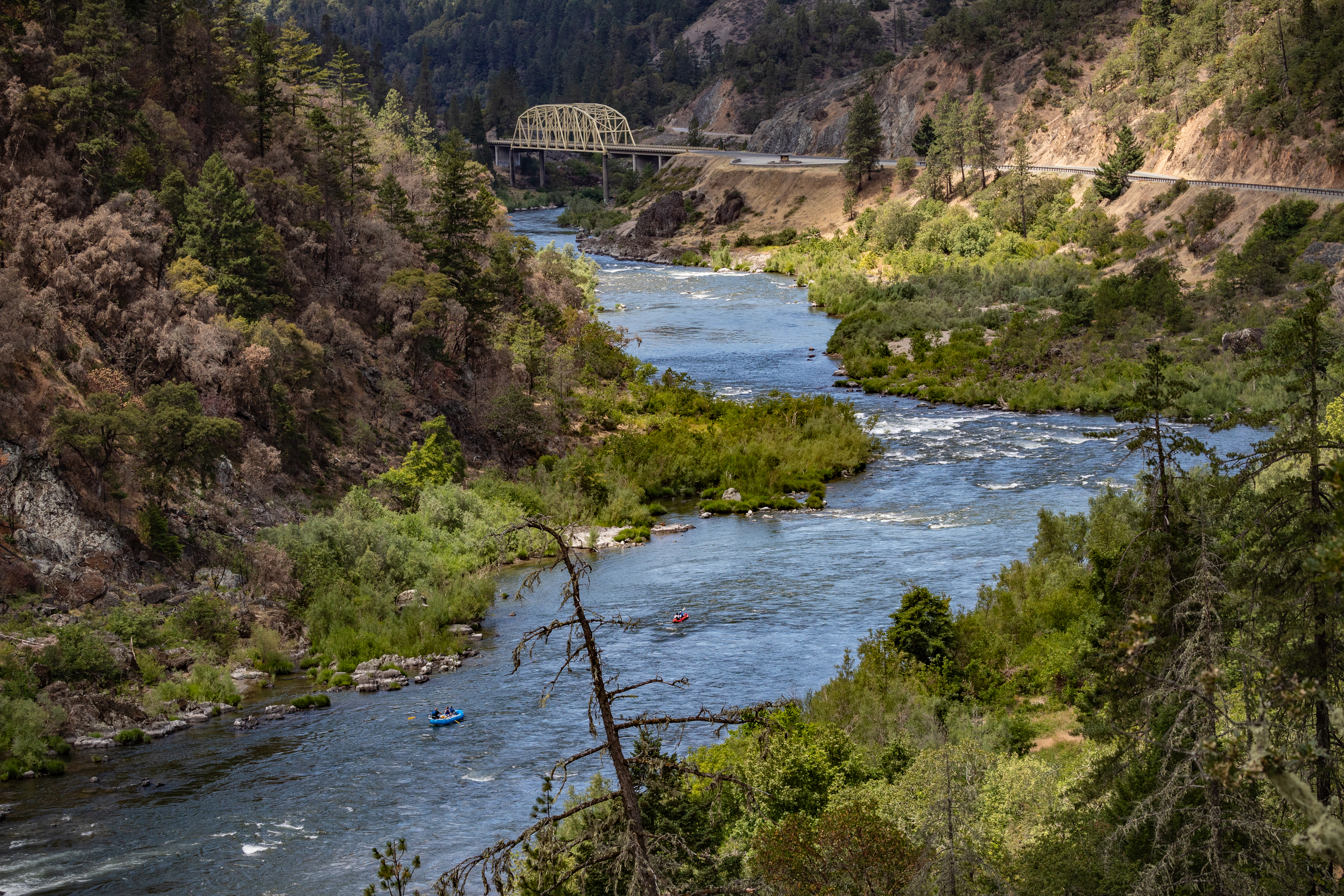
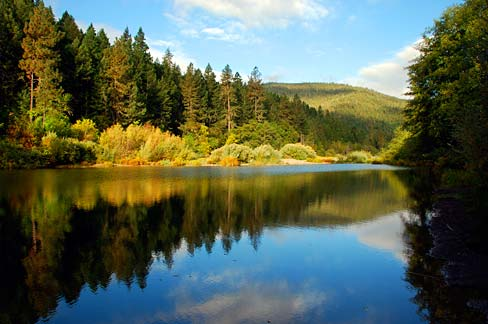
- From clockwise: Josephine County Courthouse, the "It's the Climate" banner in downtown Grants Pass, Miller's Chapel in the Oregon Caves National Monument, the Rogue River from Hellgate Canyon, Illinois River Forks State Park

- Location within the U.S. state of Oregon
- Coordinates: 42°22′N 123°34′W
- Country: United States
- State: Oregon
- Founded: January 22, 1856
- Named for: Virginia “Josephine” Rollins
- Seat: Grants Pass
- Largest city: Grants Pass

Area
  - Total: 1,642 sq mi (4,250 km^{2})
  - Land: 1,640 sq mi (4,200 km^{2})
  - Water: 2.2 sq mi (5.7 km^{2}) 0.1%

Population (2020)
  - Total: 88,090
  - Estimate (2025): 87,867 ▼
  - Density: 50/sq mi (19/km^{2})
- Time zone: UTC−8 (Pacific)
  - Summer (DST): UTC−7 (PDT)
- Congressional district: 2nd
- Website: josephinecounty.gov

Josephine County is one of the 36 counties in the U.S. state of Oregon. As of the 2020 census, the population was 88,090. The county seat is Grants Pass. The county is named after Virginia Josephine Rollins (1834–1912), a settler who was the first white woman to live in the county's boundaries. Josephine County comprises the Grants Pass, OR Metropolitan Statistical Area, which is included in the Medford-Grants Pass, OR Combined Statistical Area.

== History ==
The discovery of rich placers at Sailor Diggings (later known as Waldo) in 1852 and the resulting gold rush brought the first settlers to this region. Several U.S. Army forts were maintained in the county and many engagements during the Rogue River Indian War (1855–1858) took place within its boundaries. In 1851, a group of prospectors moved to the Illinois Valley and made the first discovery of gold in Southern Oregon. In this group was Floyd Rollins and his daughter, Josephine Rollins Ort, after whom the county is named. On January 22, 1856, a bill was passed by the territorial legislature separating what is now Josephine County from Jackson County. The bill made Sailor Diggings the county seat. It was the nineteenth, and last, county created before statehood.

In 1885, the county seat was relocated to Kerby, where the county's first jail was built. In 1885, the Oregon Legislature adjusted the boundary between Jackson and Josephine County, making Grants Pass a part of Josephine County. This was done primarily to have a railroad head within the new county. In June 1886 the voters of Josephine County considered three towns for the new county seat. These were: Kerby, Wilderville and Grants Pass. Grants Pass won with 116 votes out of the 716 ballots cast.

In the 1920s, the county improved its tourist facilities. In 1922, the Grants Pass Cavemen booster club was created, where members dressed in furs and wielded clubs at events. Events organized by the club ranged from simply blocking traffic, to bidding on the construction of the San Francisco–Oakland Bay Bridge (at a cost of 23,756,000 deer hides), to initiating politicians into their club including Mark Hatfield and Thomas E. Dewey during his 1948 presidential campaign. Russian newspapers used images of the Grants Pass Cavemen to show 'how the rich "cavort" in America.' Although bridges had been built across the Rogue River by the 1920s, ferries were still used to convey people and cars across. The first Grants Pass bridge was destroyed by a flood in 1890. The first newspaper in Josephine County was the Argus, which began publication on March 13, 1885. It lasted only a few months, but the Grants Pass Courier began three weeks later. The Illinois Valley News published in Cave Junction started in 1937 and is still a paper of record in Josephine County publishing every Wednesday. In 1897, the first legal hanging took place in Josephine County. Lemson W. Melson confessed to the murder of Charles Perry while the noose was around his neck.

=== Ethnic history ===
Although several tribes of Native Americans lived in the area from which Josephine County was created, most of their members had been moved to the reservation at Grand Ronde by the end of the Rogue River Indian War. Soon afterwards all Indians in southwest Oregon, with the exception of a few small bands, were moved to the Coast reservation (later known as the Siletz Reservation).

Josephine County was also the home to a large Chinese population. Most had come to the area to work gold claims purchased from whites no longer interested in working them. Even though they could not own land, they had to pay a tax to mine gold, and were usually relegated to inferior claims.

== Geography ==
Map of Josephine County

According to the United States Census Bureau, the county has a total

area of 1,642 square miles (4,250 km^{2}), of which 1,640 square miles (4,200 km^{2}) is land and 2.2 square miles (5.7 km^{2}) (0.1%) is water.

=== Adjacent counties ===
- Douglas County (north)
- Jackson County (east)
- Siskiyou County, California (south)
- Del Norte County, California (southwest)
- Curry County (west)

=== National protected areas ===
- Oregon Caves National Monument
- Rogue River-Siskiyou National Forest (part)

== Demographics ==
Historical population
| Census | Pop. | Note | %± |
|---|---|---|---|
| 1860 | 1,623 | | — |
| 1870 | 1,204 | | −25.8% |
| 1880 | 2,485 | | 106.4% |
| 1890 | 4,878 | | 96.3% |
| 1900 | 7,517 | | 54.1% |
| 1910 | 9,567 | | 27.3% |
| 1920 | 7,655 | | −20.0% |
| 1930 | 11,498 | | 50.2% |
| 1940 | 16,301 | | 41.8% |
| 1950 | 26,542 | | 62.8% |
| 1960 | 29,917 | | 12.7% |
| 1970 | 35,746 | | 19.5% |
| 1980 | 58,855 | | 64.6% |
| 1990 | 62,649 | | 6.4% |
| 2000 | 75,726 | | 20.9% |
| 2010 | 82,713 | | 9.2% |
| 2020 | 88,090 | | 6.5% |
| 2025 (est.) | 87,867 | ▼ | −0.3% |
U.S. Decennial Census; 1790–1960 1900–1990; 1990–2000 2010–2020

=== 2020 census ===
As of the 2020 census, the county had a population of 88,090. Of the residents, 18.6% were under the age of 18 and 27.7% were 65 years of age or older; the median age was 48.4 years. For every 100 females there were 96.6 males, and for every 100 females age 18 and over there were 94.8 males. 56.9% of residents lived in urban areas and 43.1% lived in rural areas.

The racial makeup of the county was 85.5% White, 0.5% Black or African American, 1.2% American Indian and Alaska Native, 1.0% Asian, 0.1% Native Hawaiian and Pacific Islander, 2.5% from some other race, and 9.1% from two or more races. Hispanic or Latino residents of any race comprised 8.0% of the population.

There were 36,024 households in the county, of which 23.9% had children under the age of 18 living with them and 27.1% had a female householder with no spouse or partner present. About 28.7% of all households were made up of individuals and 16.1% had someone living alone who was 65 years of age or older.

There were 38,748 housing units, of which 7.0% were vacant. Among occupied housing units, 68.9% were owner-occupied and 31.1% were renter-occupied. The homeowner vacancy rate was 1.7% and the rental vacancy rate was 4.1%.

Josephine County, Oregon – Racial and ethnic composition Note: the US Census treats Hispanic/Latino as an ethnic category. This table excludes Latinos from the racial categories and assigns them to a separate category. Hispanics/Latinos may be of any race.
| Race / Ethnicity (NH = Non-Hispanic) | Pop 1980 | Pop 1990 | Pop 2000 | Pop 2010 | Pop 2020 | % 1980 | % 1990 | % 2000 | % 2010 | % 2020 |
|---|---|---|---|---|---|---|---|---|---|---|
| White alone (NH) | 56,732 | 59,521 | 69,233 | 73,289 | 72,730 | 96.39% | 95.01% | 91.43% | 88.61% | 82.56% |
| Black or African American alone (NH) | 47 | 123 | 192 | 295 | 368 | 0.08% | 0.20% | 0.25% | 0.36% | 0.42% |
| Native American or Alaska Native alone (NH) | 597 | 802 | 844 | 966 | 883 | 1.01% | 1.28% | 1.11% | 1.17% | 1.00% |
| Asian alone (NH) | 218 | 434 | 460 | 667 | 870 | 0.37% | 0.69% | 0.61% | 0.81% | 0.99% |
| Native Hawaiian or Pacific Islander alone (NH) | x | x | 78 | 117 | 123 | x | x | 0.10% | 0.14% | 0.14% |
| Other race alone (NH) | 78 | 20 | 52 | 77 | 493 | 0.13% | 0.03% | 0.07% | 0.09% | 0.56% |
| Mixed race or Multiracial (NH) | x | x | 1,638 | 2,051 | 5,586 | x | x | 2.16% | 2.48% | 6.34% |
| Hispanic or Latino (any race) | 1,183 | 1,749 | 3,229 | 5,251 | 7,037 | 2.01% | 2.79% | 4.26% | 6.35% | 7.99% |
| Total | 58,855 | 62,649 | 75,726 | 82,713 | 88,090 | 100.00% | 100.00% | 100.00% | 100.00% | 100.00% |

=== American Community Survey 2025 data ===
The United States Census Bureau estimated that in 2025, Josephine County’s population was 87.867. It was also estimated that the county's population was 81,50% Non-Hispanic White, 10,00% Hispanic or Latino, 0,60% Non-Hispanic Black, 1,10% Asian, 1,30% Native American, 0,20% Pacific Islander, and 5,30% Multiracial.

| Total | Population | Percentage |
|---|---|---|
| Non-Hispanic White | 71.612 | 81,50% |
| Hispanic or Latino | 8.787 | 10,00% |
| Non-Hispanic Black | 527 | 0,60% |
| Asian | 967 | 1,10% |
| Native American | 1.142 | 1,30% |
| Pacific Islander | 176 | 0,20% |
| Non-Hispanic Multiracial | 4.657 | 5,30% |

=== 2010 census ===
As of the 2010 census, there were 82,713 people, 34,646 households, and 22,498 families residing in the county. The population density was 50.4 inhabitants per square mile (19.5/km^{2}). There were 38,001 housing units at an average density of 23.2 units per square mile (9.0 units/km^{2}). The racial makeup of the county was 92.4% white, 1.4% American Indian, 0.8% Asian, 0.4% black or African American, 0.2% Pacific islander, 1.5% from other races, and 3.2% from two or more races. Those of Hispanic or Latino origin made up 6.3% of the population. In terms of ancestry, 26.3% were German, 15.6% were Irish, 15.5% were English, 5.5% were Italian, and 5.5% were American.

Of the 34,646 households, 25.5% had children under the age of 18 living with them, 49.2% were married couples living together, 11.0% had a female householder with no husband present, 35.1% were non-families, and 28.3% of all households were made up of individuals. The average household size was 2.34 and the average family size was 2.82. The median age was 47.3 years.

The median income for a household in the county was $38,035 and the median income for a family was $48,180. Males had a median income of $38,675 versus $27,926 for females. The per capita income for the county was $21,539. About 13.5% of families and 17.8% of the population were below the poverty line, including 27.3% of those under age 18 and 9.1% of those age 65 or over.

=== 2000 census ===
As of the 2000 census, there were 75,726 people, 31,000 households, and 21,359 families residing in the county. The population density was 46 people per square mile (18 people/km^{2}). There were 33,239 housing units at an average density of 20 units per square mile (7.7/km^{2}). The racial makeup of the county was 93.90% White, 0.27% Black or African American, 1.25% Native American, 0.63% Asian, 0.11% Pacific Islander, 1.17% from other races, and 2.68% from two or more races. 4.26% of the population were Hispanic or Latino of any race. 18.5% were of German, 14.3% English, 10.4% Irish and 9.3% American ancestry according to Census 2000. 95.6% spoke English and 2.8% Spanish as their first language.

There were 31,000 households, out of which 26.90% had children under the age of 18 living with them, 54.40% were married couples living together, 10.40% had a female householder with no husband present, and 31.10% were non-families. 25.40% of all households were made up of individuals, and 12.10% had someone living alone who was 65 years of age or older. The average household size was 2.41 and the average family size was 2.85.

In the county, the population was spread out, with 23.10% under the age of 18, 6.50% from 18 to 24, 23.20% from 25 to 44, 27.20% from 45 to 64, and 20.10% who were 65 years of age or older. The median age was 43 years. For every 100 females there were 94.60 males. For every 100 females age 18 and over, there were 91.10 males.

The median income for a household in the county was $31,229, and the median income for a family was $36,894. Males had a median income of $30,798 versus $22,734 for females. The per capita income for the county was $17,234. About 11.30% of families and 15.00% of the population were below the poverty line, including 21.10% of those under age 18 and 6.80% of those age 65 or over.

== Communities ==
=== Cities ===
- Cave Junction
- Grants Pass (county seat)

=== Census-designated places ===
- Kerby
- Merlin
- New Hope
- O'Brien
- Redwood
- Selma
- Takilma
- Williams

=== Unincorporated communities ===
- Bridgeview
- Dryden
- Galice
- Holland
- Hugo
- Leland
- Murphy
- Placer
- Pleasant Valley
- Rand
- Sunny Valley
- Three Pines
- Wilderville
- Wolf Creek
- Wonder

=== Former communities ===
- Althouse (former)
- Browntown
- California Bar
- Golden
- Greenback
- Harbeck-Fruitdale (now part of Grants Pass)
- Speaker
- Waldo

== Economy ==
Most of the commercial activity during the territorial period centered on gold mining and the supply of provisions to miners. Miners had been active in the Rogue and Illinois valleys since 1851. By the late 1850s, however, gold mining was beginning to decline and population dwindled as well. In 1859, gold was discovered along the Fraser River in British Columbia and numerous people left Josephine County to search for valuable claims there.

Josephine County shares the Rogue Valley and Applegate Valley wine appellations with Jackson County. The U.S. government owns the majority of the land within the county boundaries, with the Bureau of Land Management owning 28% of the lands within the county boundaries, most of which are Oregon and California Railroad lands, and the Forest Service owning 39%.

Grants Pass is now the departure point for most Rogue River scenic waterway guided fishing and boat trips, one of the destinations being Hellgate canyon. The Illinois River, one of the Rogue's tributaries, has also been designated a scenic waterway.

== Transportation ==
Initially, freight was brought into Josephine County by pack train. As the trails improved, freight wagons were used. Stage coaches were the primary mode of transportation until 1914, when auto stages took over, halving the time from Crescent City to Grants Pass from 24 to 12 hours.

In 1883, the Oregon and California Railroad reached Grants Pass, in Jackson County at the time. The first through train from Portland, Oregon arrived in Grants Pass on Christmas Eve of 1883. Due to delays in completing a railroad through the Siskiyou Mountains, the first train from California didn't arrive until 1887. Josephine County was served by the Oregon and California Railroad. In 1923, commercial flight in Josephine County began when airplanes began taking off from the American Legion Air Field. The airfield has since been replaced by an industrial park.

== Politics ==
Josephine County has been among the most consistently Republican counties in Oregon with regard to presidential elections. In 1964, it was along with Malheur County one of two Oregon counties to give a majority to Barry Goldwater. This is the county in Oregon to have gone the longest without voting for a Democrat in a presidential election; the last Democratic candidate to win the county was Franklin D. Roosevelt in 1936, and the solitary Democrat since 1900 to win an absolute majority was Roosevelt in 1932 (though, in 1916, the county was won by Charles Evans Hughes by just four votes). Prior to the 1890s, Josephine was a generally Democratic county as the Rogue Valley and adjacent areas, like the San Joaquin Valley in California, had considerable anti-Union sympathies.

As of 2024, Josephine County lies within Oregon's 2nd congressional district, which is represented by the Republican Congressman Cliff Bentz. In the Oregon House of Representatives, Josephine County is split between two districts. A portion in the northeast is in the 4th District (extending into Douglas and Jackson counties), represented by Republican Christine Goodwin. The majority of Josephine County, including the core of Grants Pass, lies within the 3rd District represented by Republican Dwayne Yunker. The whole of Josephine County is within Oregon's 2nd Senate District, represented by Republican Art Robinson.

In 2004, Democrat Dennis Kucinich spoke publicly while campaigning in Josephine County, making appearances in both Grants Pass and Cave Junction. Robert Kennedy made a campaign stop in Grants Pass in late May 1968 at the conclusion of a whistle stop campaign tour by train originating in Portland. Kennedy spoke to a crowd of several hundred in a supermarket parking lot on the site of the former Southern Pacific passenger station which had been demolished some years previously just a week before his assassination in California on June 5, 1968.

Despite its conservative reputation, Josephine County voters rejected a secessionist proposal to join the Greater Idaho coalition in May 2022, defeating it on a vote of 51.3% in opposition to 48.7% in support. This came despite the fact that, in 2020, Donald Trump won 61.48% of the county's votes to 35.73% for Joe Biden.

United States presidential election results for Josephine County, Oregon
| Year | Republican | | Democratic | | Third party(ies) | |
| Year | No. | % | No. | % | No. | % |
|---|---|---|---|---|---|---|
| 1904 | 914 | 60.89% | 327 | 21.79% | 260 | 17.32% |
| 1908 | 967 | 47.47% | 732 | 35.94% | 338 | 16.59% |
| 1912 | 305 | 13.68% | 702 | 31.48% | 1,223 | 54.84% |
| 1916 | 1,660 | 46.20% | 1,656 | 46.09% | 277 | 7.71% |
| 1920 | 1,606 | 62.22% | 819 | 31.73% | 156 | 6.04% |
| 1924 | 1,756 | 53.91% | 650 | 19.96% | 851 | 26.13% |
| 1928 | 2,625 | 71.31% | 959 | 26.05% | 97 | 2.64% |
| 1932 | 1,757 | 33.80% | 3,060 | 58.87% | 381 | 7.33% |
| 1936 | 1,992 | 33.45% | 2,840 | 47.69% | 1,123 | 18.86% |
| 1940 | 3,964 | 57.18% | 2,888 | 41.66% | 80 | 1.15% |
| 1944 | 4,010 | 54.52% | 3,214 | 43.70% | 131 | 1.78% |
| 1948 | 5,004 | 58.27% | 3,290 | 38.31% | 294 | 3.42% |
| 1952 | 8,200 | 70.36% | 3,353 | 28.77% | 102 | 0.88% |
| 1956 | 7,967 | 62.10% | 4,863 | 37.90% | 0 | 0.00% |
| 1960 | 7,387 | 57.57% | 5,419 | 42.23% | 25 | 0.19% |
| 1964 | 6,918 | 50.13% | 6,857 | 49.68% | 26 | 0.19% |
| 1968 | 8,456 | 57.64% | 4,351 | 29.66% | 1,864 | 12.71% |
| 1972 | 9,911 | 58.55% | 5,090 | 30.07% | 1,926 | 11.38% |
| 1976 | 10,726 | 50.81% | 9,061 | 42.92% | 1,323 | 6.27% |
| 1980 | 16,827 | 63.89% | 7,116 | 27.02% | 2,393 | 9.09% |
| 1984 | 19,470 | 69.38% | 8,539 | 30.43% | 53 | 0.19% |
| 1988 | 15,876 | 58.21% | 10,646 | 39.04% | 750 | 2.75% |
| 1992 | 13,003 | 38.75% | 11,007 | 32.80% | 9,549 | 28.45% |
| 1996 | 16,048 | 49.98% | 11,113 | 34.61% | 4,950 | 15.42% |
| 2000 | 22,186 | 60.40% | 11,864 | 32.30% | 2,683 | 7.30% |
| 2004 | 26,241 | 62.07% | 15,214 | 35.99% | 820 | 1.94% |
| 2008 | 22,973 | 54.63% | 17,412 | 41.41% | 1,664 | 3.96% |
| 2012 | 23,673 | 58.83% | 14,953 | 37.16% | 1,612 | 4.01% |
| 2016 | 26,923 | 60.42% | 13,453 | 30.19% | 4,184 | 9.39% |
| 2020 | 31,751 | 61.48% | 18,451 | 35.73% | 1,439 | 2.79% |
| 2024 | 31,129 | 62.72% | 16,928 | 34.11% | 1,571 | 3.17% |

== Libraries ==
In May 2007, all libraries in Josephine County were closed due to lack of county government funding. In September 2007, committed community members formed Josephine Community Libraries, Inc., a nonprofit, nongovernmental organization. On December 20, 2008, the Grants Pass library opened again. On September 5, 2009, the Illinois Valley library was reopened. On November 7, 2009, the Williams library was reopened. With the reopening of the Wolf Creek branch on December 19, 2009, all four library branches in Josephine County were restored. Josephine Community Libraries, Inc. (JCLI) is a nonprofit, nongovernmental library system serving the 82,000 residents of Josephine County. In May 2017, citizens placed a measure on the ballot to permanently fund the libraries, which passed by 53 percent of the vote. For 10 years, the libraries were supported by generous donations and the heroic contributions of more than 360 volunteers annually. Now, JCLI is committed to a seamless transition of library services to the newly formed library district and is working to support the district effort until the anticipated transition is completed in 2018.

== See also ==
- National Register of Historic Places listings in Josephine County, Oregon
