= XXXXVII Corps =

XXXXVII Corps, XLVII Corps, or 47th Corps may refer to:

- XXXXVII Panzer Corps, Wehrmacht, Germany
- 47th Army Corps (Russian Empire)
- 47th Rifle Corps, Soviet Union
- 47th (Grocers) Lanarkshire Rifle Volunteer Corps, United Kingdom
- 47th (St Helens) Lancashire Rifle Volunteer Corps, United Kingdom

== See also ==
- List of military corps by number
- 47th Battalion (disambiguation)
- 47th Brigade (disambiguation)
- 47th Division (disambiguation)
- 47th Regiment (disambiguation)
- 47th Squadron (disambiguation)
- 47th (disambiguation)
