= 47th Cavalry =

47th Cavalry may refer to:

- 47th Cavalry Division, Soviet Union
- 47th Arkansas Infantry (Mounted), sometimes called the 47th Arkansas Cavalry
- 47th Virginia Cavalry Battalion, Confederate States Army
- 47th (Duke of Cambridge's Own) Company, Imperial Yeomanry

== See also ==
- 47th Division (disambiguation)
- 47th Brigade (disambiguation)
- 47th Regiment (disambiguation)
- 47th (disambiguation)
