= Channel 47 =

Channel 47 refers to several television stations:

- ANTV, Indonesia on Channel 47 UHF for Jakarta territories

== Canada ==
The following television stations operate on virtual channel 47:

- CFHD-DT in Montreal, Quebec
- CFMT-DT in Toronto, Ontario

For UHF frequencies covering 668-674 MHz:

- Channel 47 TV stations in Canada

== United states ==
For stations operate on virtual channel 47:

- Channel 47 virtual TV stations in the United States

For UHF frequencies covering 668-674 MHz:

- Channel 47 digital TV stations in the United States
- Channel 47 low-power TV stations in the United States

== Other uses ==
- For UHF frequencies covering 668-674 MHz: Channel 47 TV stations in Mexico
- TV47 Kenya

== See also ==
- 47 (disambiguation)
