= 47th =

47th is the ordinal form of the number 47. 47th or Forty-seventh may also refer to:

- A fraction, 1/47, equal to one of 47 equal parts
- The 47th, 2022 play in blank verse by Mike Bartlet

== Geography ==
- 47th meridian east, a line of longitude
- 47th meridian west, a line of longitude
- 47th parallel north, a circle of latitude
- 47th parallel south, a circle of latitude
- 47th Street (disambiguation)

=== Chicago Transit Authority stations ===
- 47th station (CTA Green Line), on the Green Line
- 47th station (CTA Red Line), on the Red Line

== Military ==
- 47th Army
- 47th Battalion (disambiguation)
- 47th Brigade (disambiguation)
- 47th Division (disambiguation)
- 47th Regiment (disambiguation)
- 47th Squadron (disambiguation)

== Other ==
- 47th century
- 47th century BC

== See also ==
- 47 (disambiguation)
