= List of highways numbered 46 =

The following highways are numbered 46:

== International ==
- AH46 Asian Highway 46
- E46 European route E46

== Australia ==
- Greensborough Highway
- Carnarvon Highway

== Canada ==
- Saskatchewan Highway 46

== Czech Republic ==
- part of D46 Motorway
- I/46 Highway; Czech: Silnice I/46

== Germany ==
- Bundesautobahn 46

== Greece ==
- EO46 road, an airport road to Tanagra Air Base

== India ==
- National Highway 46 (India)

== Iran ==
- Road 46

== Israel ==
- Highway 46 (Israel)

== Japan ==
- Japan National Route 46

== Korea, South ==
- National Route 46

== New Zealand ==
- New Zealand State Highway 46

== Ukraine ==
- P46 road (Ukraine)

== United Kingdom ==
- British A46 (Batheaston-Cleethorpes)

== United States ==
- U.S. Route 46
  - U.S. Route 46 (Colorado) (former proposal)
- Alabama State Route 46
  - County Route 46 (Lee County, Alabama)
- Arkansas Highway 46
- California State Route 46
  - County Route J46 (California)
- Colorado State Highway 46
- Florida State Road 46
  - Florida State Road 46 (pre-1945) (former)
- Georgia State Route 46
  - Georgia State Route 46 (former)
- Idaho State Highway 46
- Illinois Route 46 (former)
- Indiana State Road 46
- Iowa Highway 46 (former)
- K-46 (Kansas highway)
- Kentucky Route 46
- Louisiana Highway 46
- Maine State Route 46
- Maryland Route 46 (former)
- M-46 (Michigan highway)
- Minnesota State Highway 46
- Mississippi Highway 46
- Missouri Route 46
- Nebraska Highway 46
- Nevada State Route 46 (former)
- New Jersey Route 46 (former)
  - County Route 46 (Monmouth County, New Jersey)
- New York State Route 46
  - County Route 46 (Cattaraugus County, New York)
  - County Route 46 (Cayuga County, New York)
  - County Route 46 (Chemung County, New York)
  - County Route 46 (Columbia County, New York)
  - County Route 46 (Dutchess County, New York)
  - County Route 46 (Genesee County, New York)
  - County Route 46 (Herkimer County, New York)
  - County Route 46 (Jefferson County, New York)
  - County Route 46 (Lewis County, New York)
  - County Route 46 (Livingston County, New York)
  - County Route 46 (Madison County, New York)
  - County Route 46 (Oneida County, New York)
  - County Route 46 (Onondaga County, New York)
  - County Route 46 (Oswego County, New York)
  - County Route 46 (Otsego County, New York)
  - County Route 46 (Putnam County, New York)
  - County Route 46 (Rockland County, New York)
  - County Route 46 (Schoharie County, New York)
  - County Route 46 (Steuben County, New York)
  - County Route 46 (Suffolk County, New York)
  - County Route 46 (Ulster County, New York)
- North Carolina Highway 46
- North Dakota Highway 46
- Ohio State Route 46
- Oklahoma State Highway 46
- Oregon Route 46
- Pennsylvania Route 46
- South Carolina Highway 46
- South Dakota Highway 46
- Tennessee State Route 46
- Texas State Highway 46
  - Texas State Highway Loop 46
  - Farm to Market Road 46
  - Texas Park Road 46
- Utah State Route 46
- Virginia State Route 46
- West Virginia Route 46
- Wisconsin Highway 46

== See also ==
- A46
- List of highways numbered 46A

Preceded by 45	Lists of highways 46	Succeeded by 47
