= 47 Squadron =

47 Squadron or 47th Squadron may refer to:

- No. 47 Squadron IAF, Indian Air Force
- No. 47 Squadron RAF, a unit of the United Kingdom Royal Air Force
- 47th Fighter Squadron, a unit of the United States Air Force
- 47th Bombardment Squadron, a unit of the United States Air Force
- 47th Liaison Squadron, a unit of the United States Air Force

== See also ==
- 47th Division (disambiguation)
- 47th Brigade (disambiguation)
