= List of highways numbered 46A =

The following highways are numbered 46A:

- Florida State Road 46A (former)
- New York State Route 46A (former)

== See also ==
- A46 (disambiguation)
- List of highways numbered 46
