= Monterey Furniture =

Furniture style made from 1930 to the mid-1940s in California

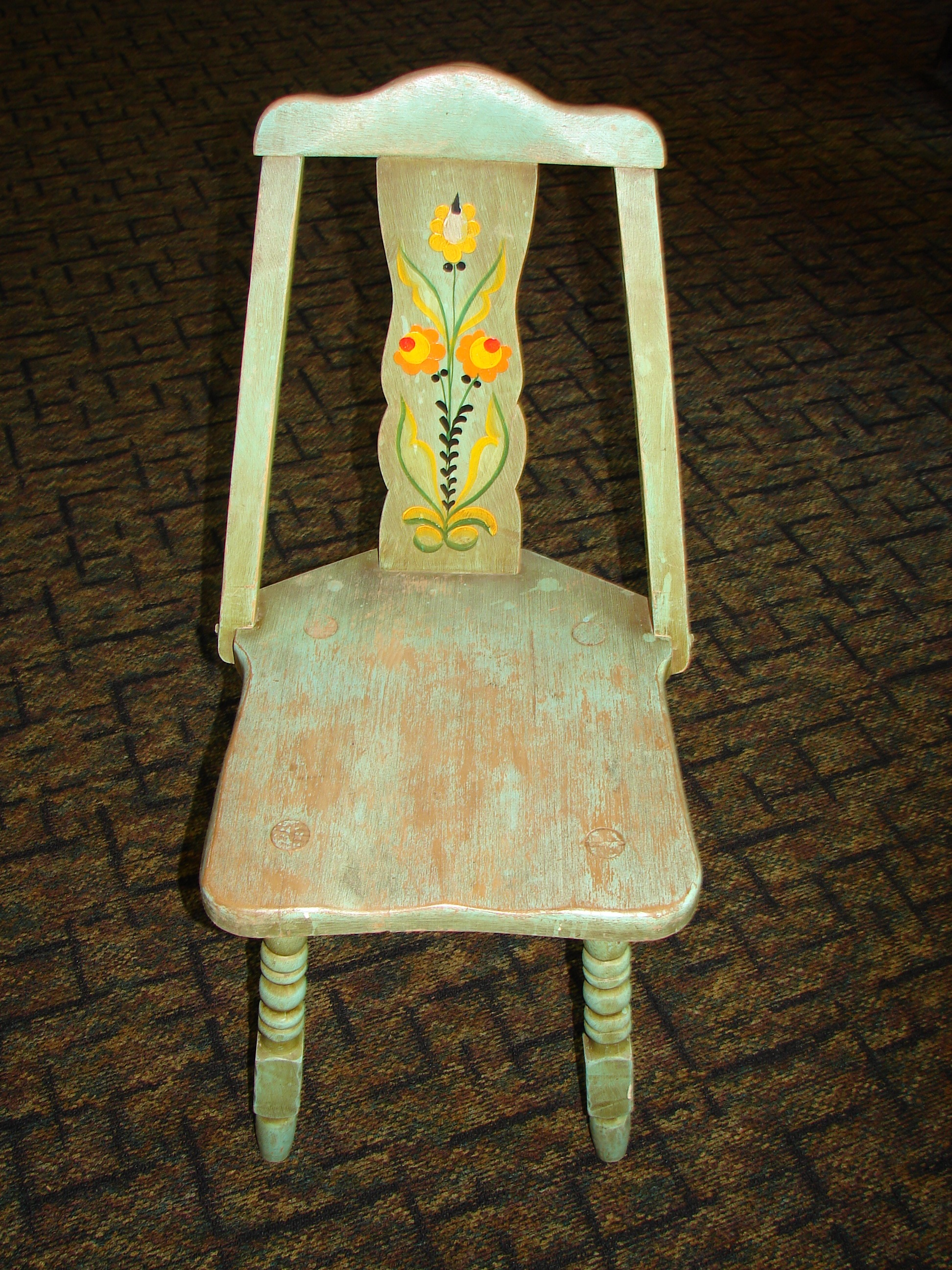
Mason Monterey A-frame chair from the Oregon Caves National Monument Chateau

Monterey Furniture refers to several furniture lines made from 1930 to the mid-1940s in California. Uniquely western, the line derived its character from Spanish and Dutch Colonial styles, California Mission architecture and furnishings, ranch furnishings, and cowboy accoutrements such as might be found in a barn (lariats and branding irons). Mason Manufacturing Company, founded by Frank Mason and his son, George, are credited with the original style of its time. Other lines were made by Imperial Company, Angeles Furniture Company (the line called Coronado), Del Rey, Brown-Saltman, but even Sears (La Fiesta) and Stickley created Monterey-style furniture.

Mason Monterey was generally made from Oregon alder, and the "classic period", from 1930–1932 was painted with a lively Mexican palette toned down with an asphaltum glaze that created the look of antique furniture. Many layers of paint went into the final finish in the Mason line. The colors used were bold: Spanish Red, Spanish Green, Spanish Blue, Straw Yellow. Neutrals had an old antiqued charm in Straw Ivory and Old Wood. In the beginning most pieces had some sort of decorative elements, such as the "river of life," a lively squiggle, or a floral decoration. The Mexican cartoonist Juan Intenoche headed the paint department, and the most valuable pieces of Monterey contain his whimsical designs. Donkeys, caballeros, sleeping men under wide hats, cactus and other images are his trademark. Mason branded most of their furniture with a horseshoe and the name, "Monterey," though not all are branded. Smoke from the branding occasionally was too thick for the workers; on those days they simply stopped branding. The company produced furniture for 14 years, and went through the following periods: classic, transitional, and middle. Toward the end of its manufacturing career, the company began making rather mundane furniture that did not look like Monterey style, but was a revival of American Colonial.

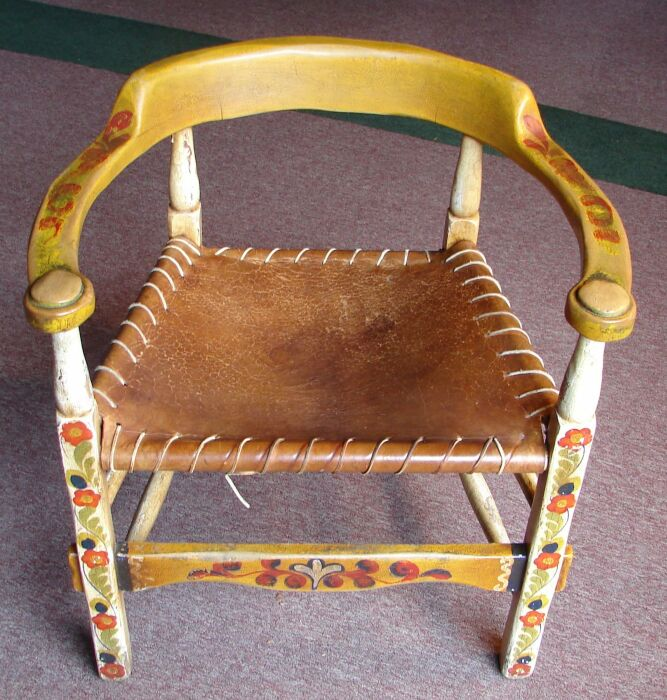
Straw yellow and straw ivory Mason Monterey, horseshoe-back, polychrome chair

Hollywood and Barker Brothers were influential in the creation of Mason's furniture line, in that Barker Brothers approached Frank Mason with the idea of creating a line of furniture based on furniture seen in a popular early "talkie," In Old Arizona by Fox Film Corporation, 1929. Spanish Revival homes were being built all over Los Angeles, and Barker Brothers wanted a line of furniture that could complement the style of the homes. The largest public collection was bought for the Chateau in 1933 at the Oregon Caves National Monument; most of the collection is from the early classic period. In 2010, the first two dozen pieces of Mason Monterey were conserved and restored.

Imperial Monterey was made from mahogany. It was a heavier line, well built and well designed, with quality iron work to reinforce the structure. The color palette occasionally contained decorative floral designs, but Imperial was known for the simpler brown finish akin to the Old Wood finish of the Mason line. The largest original public collection of Imperial Monterey was recently conserved, and is in use at Crater Lake National Park's superintendent's home, now the Science and Learning Center.

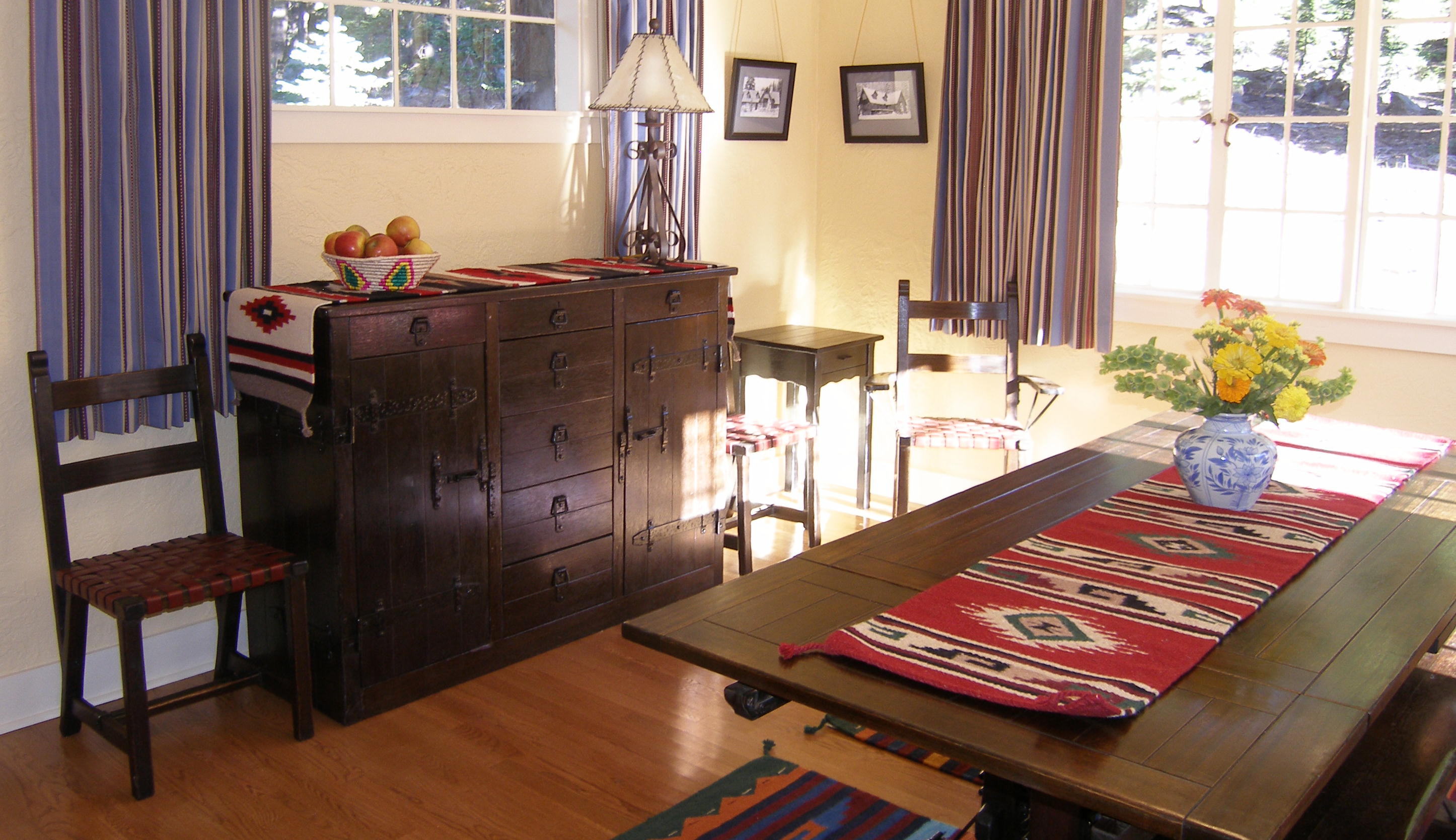
Original Imperial Monterey hutch in the dining room of the Science and Learning Center at Crater Lake National Park

The Coronado line was generally a lighter blonde shade of antiqued oil paint, and the design contained more angles and had wrapped rope decor. Intenoche apparently moonlighted at the Angeles Factory, as his designs are also found on Coronado furniture. The company branded its line with a crown featuring the word Coronado.
