= 47 =

47, '47 or forty-seven may refer to:

- 47 (number), the integer following 46 and preceding 48
- 47 BC
- AD 47
- '47, a year ending in 47, such as 1947 or 2047

== Arts and media ==
- '47 (magazine), an American publication
- 47 (song), a 2019 single by Sidhu Moose Wala
- 47, a song by New Found Glory on 2009 album Not Without a Fight
- "Forty Seven", a song by Karma to Burn on 2011 album V
- 4seven, a British television channel
- Agent 47, protagonist of the Hitman video game series
- 47, a 2005 young adult novel by Walter Mosley

== Politics ==
- 47 percent, a 2012 pejorative phrase by Mitt Romney
- Donald Trump, the 47th president of the United States
  - Agenda 47, code for the Trumpist plans in the elections for the 47th president

== Other uses ==
- '47 (brand), an American clothing brand
- +47, the international calling code for Norway
- 47 Aglaja, a main-belt asteroid
- Kurdish Mafia, a street gang known as 47kurdish mafia or just 47

== See also ==
- 47th (disambiguation)
- List of highways numbered 47
- Channel 47 (disambiguation)
- M47 (disambiguation), including "Model 47" (M47)
- Forty-seven Ronin (disambiguation)
- A47 (disambiguation)
- Capital Steez, an American rapper who was infatuated with the number 47 and what it meant spiritually
