= Hitman 47 =

Hitman 47 may refer to several properties in the Hitman (franchise):

- Agent 47, the main character, a hitman
- Hitman: Agent 47, a 2016 film in the franchise
- Hitman: Codename 47, a 2000 videogame in the franchise

== See also ==
- Hitman (disambiguation)
- 47 (disambiguation)
