= 47th Battalion =

47th Battalion may refer to:

- 47th Battalion (Australia), a unit of the Australian Army
- 47th Frontenac Battalion, a Canadian Militia unit
- 47th (British Columbia) Battalion, CEF, a unit of the Canadian Army
- 47th Virginia Cavalry Battalion, a unit of the Confederate States Army

== See also ==
- 47th Division (disambiguation)
- 47th Regiment (disambiguation)
- 47 Squadron (disambiguation)
