= 47th Street station =

47th Street station may refer to:

== In Chicago ==
- 47th station (CTA Green Line), in the Grand Boulevard community area
- 47th station (CTA Red Line), in the Fuller Park neighborhood
- 47th Street/Kenwood station, a commuter rail station on the Metra Electric Line
- 47th Street station (Chicago and Western Indiana Railroad), a former rail station on the present-day SouthWest Service.

== In New York City ==
- 47th Street station (IRT Third Avenue Line)
- 47th–50th Streets–Rockefeller Center station; serving the B, D, F, <F>, and M trains

== Elsewhere ==
- 47th Street station (San Diego Trolley)

== See also ==
- 47th Street (disambiguation)
