= M47 =

M47 or M-47 may refer to:

- M47 bomb, an American chemical/incendiary weapon
- 47th known Mersenne prime
- M47 Dragon, an American anti-tank missile system
- M-47 (Michigan highway), a state highway in Michigan
- M47 (Cape Town), a Metropolitan Route in Cape Town, South Africa
- M47 (Johannesburg), a Metropolitan Route in Johannesburg, South Africa
- M47 Patton, an American main battle tank
- BMW M47, diesel engine (1998–2007)
- Messier 47, an open star cluster in the constellation Puppis
- Madsen M47, a Danish rifle

== See also ==
- 47 (disambiguation)
