= List of highways numbered 47 =

The following highways are numbered 47:

== International ==
- AH47 Asian Highway 47
- E47 European route E47

== Australia ==
East West Link (proposed)

== Canada ==
- Alberta Highway 47
- Ontario Highway 47
- Saskatchewan Highway 47

== France ==
- A47 autoroute

== India ==
- National Highway 47 (India)
- State Highway 47 (Karnataka)

== Iran ==
- Road 47

== Iraq ==
- Highway 47 (Iraq)

== Japan ==
- Japan National Route 47

== Korea, South ==
- National Route 47

== New Zealand ==
- New Zealand State Highway 47

== Poland ==
- unbuilt expressway S47
- National road 47

== United Kingdom ==
- A47 (Birmingham - Great Yarmouth)

== United States ==
- Alabama State Route 47
  - County Route 47 (Lee County, Alabama)
- Arkansas Highway 47 (former)
- California State Route 47
- Colorado State Highway 47
- Connecticut Route 47
- Florida State Road 47
- Georgia State Route 47
- Idaho State Highway 47
- Illinois Route 47
- Indiana State Road 47
- Iowa 47 (former)
- K-47 (Kansas highway)
- Kentucky Route 47
- Louisiana Highway 47
  - Louisiana State Route 47 (former)
- Maryland Route 47
  - Maryland Route 47A
- Massachusetts Route 47
- M-47 (Michigan highway)
- Minnesota State Highway 47
  - County Road 47 (Dakota County, Minnesota)
- Mississippi Highway 47
- Missouri Route 47
- Montana Highway 47
- Nebraska Highway 47
  - Nebraska Spur 47A
- Nevada State Route 47 (former)
- New Hampshire Route 47
- New Jersey Route 47
  - County Route 47 (Monmouth County, New Jersey)
  - County Route 47 (Ocean County, New Jersey)
- New Mexico State Road 47
- New York State Route 47 (former)
  - County Route 47 (Cattaraugus County, New York)
  - County Route 47 (Dutchess County, New York)
  - County Route 47 (Erie County, New York)
  - County Route 47 (Genesee County, New York)
  - County Route 47 (Greene County, New York)
  - County Route 47 (Jefferson County, New York)
  - County Route 47 (Ontario County, New York)
  - County Route 47 (Otsego County, New York)
  - County Route 47 (Putnam County, New York)
  - County Route 47 (Rensselaer County, New York)
  - County Route 47 (Rockland County, New York)
  - County Route 47 (Schenectady County, New York)
  - County Route 47 (St. Lawrence County, New York)
  - County Route 47 (Suffolk County, New York)
  - County Route 47 (Ulster County, New York)
  - County Route 47 (Warren County, New York)
- North Carolina Highway 47
- North Dakota Highway 47 (former)
- Ohio State Route 47
- Oklahoma State Highway 47
  - Oklahoma State Highway 47A
- Oregon Route 47
- Pennsylvania Route 47 (former)
- South Carolina Highway 47
- South Dakota Highway 47
  - South Dakota Highway 47W (former)
- Tennessee State Route 47
- Texas State Highway 47
  - Texas State Highway Loop 47
  - Farm to Market Road 47
  - Texas Park Road 47
- Utah State Route 47 (former)
- Virginia State Route 47
  - Virginia State Route 47 (1928-1930) (former)
  - Virginia State Route 47 (1930-1933) (former)
- West Virginia Route 47
  - West Virginia Route 47 (1920s) (former)
- Wisconsin Highway 47

Territories

- Puerto Rico Highway 47

== See also ==
- A47

Preceded by 46	Lists of highways 47	Succeeded by 48
