= WMDT =

Television station in Salisbury, Maryland

- Salisbury, Maryland; United States
- Channels: Digital: 29 (UHF); Virtual: 47
- Branding: 47 ABC; Delmarva CW 3 (47.2)

Programming
- Affiliations: 47.1: ABC; 47.2: CW+; for others, see § Technical information and subchannels

Ownership
- Owner: Marquee Broadcasting, Inc.
- Sister stations: WGDV-LD

History
- First air date: April 11, 1980
- Former channel numbers: Analog: 47 (UHF, 1980–2008); Digital: 53 (UHF, 2000–2008), 47 (UHF, 2008–2020)
- Former affiliations: NBC (secondary, 1980–1992)
- Call sign meaning: Maryland / Delaware Television (Note: The owners had hoped to name the station WMDV, with a V for Virginia, but that call sign was already in use.)

Technical information
- Licensing authority: FCC
- Facility ID: 16455
- ERP: 246 kW
- HAAT: 307 m (1,007 ft)
- Transmitter coordinates: 38°30′6.4″N 75°44′7.4″W

Links
- Public license information: Public file; LMS
- Website: www.wmdt.com

WMDT (channel 47) is a television station in Salisbury, Maryland, United States, affiliated with ABC and The CW Plus. It is the flagship television property of locally based Marquee Broadcasting and has studios on the Downtown Plaza along West Main Street in Salisbury; WMDT's transmitter is located in Wicomico County northeast of Mardela Springs.

WMDT was the second commercial station to serve the Delmarva Peninsula, signing on in April 1980. It struggled financially and was placed in court-appointed receivership less than 18 months after beginning broadcasting. From 1982 to 2013, it was owned by the Brechner family. Marquee Broadcasting acquired WMDT in 2013 as its first TV station property. In local news ratings, WMDT has long been a second-place station to WBOC-TV.

== History ==
=== Construction and early struggles ===
In early 1978, the MDV Television Company petitioned the Federal Communications Commission (FCC) to insert a second commercial television channel at Salisbury, then served only by primary CBS affiliate WBOC-TV (channel 16) and a Maryland Public Television repeater. MDV head Robert Hennessy said that Delmarva was inadequately served by the Philadelphia and Baltimore stations and that WBOC-TV's local news coverage was also inadequate. The commission assigned the channel in July 1978, allowing potential owners to apply for a construction permit to build and operate the station.

MDV Television received the permit in May 1979. Local authorities in Wicomico County were initially reluctant to allow the construction of a transmitting tower, as some nearby locals feared its construction would affect their health or property values, but approved construction of the tower in June. The station announced it had obtained an ABC affiliation in July; among its stockholders were William Sheehan and Walter Pfister, former president and director of special news events, respectively, at ABC. WMDT set up in studio facilities that once housed a Rite Aid drug store and restaurant on Salisbury's Downtown Plaza. Shortly before launch, it picked up a secondary affiliation with NBC; at launch, it only aired one NBC program, Saturday Night Live.

WMDT began broadcasting on April 11, 1980; two months passed before the station aired local news programming. The station struggled in its early years from technical problems, low ratings against WBOC-TV (the only station on Delmarva for 26 years), and persistent rumors of financial trouble. In March 1981, MDV announced an infusion of new cash into the business. President J. Paul Audet, who had previously been involved in the startup of TV stations in New Mexico and South Carolina, noted that the station was three months late in getting on air, leaving it undercapitalized. In June, a receiver was appointed on a petition from the First National Bank of Maryland, which it owed $3 million plus interest.

=== Brechner ownership ===
In 1982, a court approved the sale of WMDT to Mid-Florida Television, which owned a partial stake in WFTV in Orlando, Florida. The station's law firm, which said it was owed money, objected to the purchase. The sale was finalized in July.

WMDT launched a bureau in Dover, Delaware, as well as translator W27AJ there, in 1987. The next year, the station debuted Newswatch 27, a newscast specifically for Dover and Kent County, produced from a studio in the city and only aired on the translator; the long-term goal was to have television ratings agencies assign Kent County into the Salisbury media market, thereby making it larger and increasing revenues. The Dover translator remained with WMDT, later under the call sign WEVD-LP, until later owner Marquee Broadcasting swapped it for three low-power stations owned by Lowcountry 34 Media in 2020.

WMDT launched a cable-only affiliate of The WB as part of The WB 100+ Station Group in May 2000. This service affiliated with The CW in 2006, when The WB and UPN merged, and was broadcast as a subchannel of WMDT by 2008. Upon the launch of The CW, it began airing local midday and 10 p.m. newscasts on that channel.

=== Marquee Broadcasting ownership ===
Brechner Management Company announced the sale of WMDT to Marquee Broadcasting on August 8, 2013. It was the first broadcast property for the company, owned by Brookeville residents Patricia and Brian Lane, who had sought to buy a TV station for five years.

=== Notable former on-air staff ===
- Bonnie Bernstein
- Greg Fishel
- Gregg Jarrett
- Mike Seidel

== Technical information and subchannels ==
WMDT's transmitter is located in Wicomico County northeast of Mardela Springs. Its signal is multiplexed:

Subchannels of WMDT
Subchannel	Res.	Short name	Programming
47.1	720p	ABC	ABC
47.2	720p	CW	The CW Plus
47.3	480i	MeTV	MeTV
47.4	480i	Ion	Ion

=== Analog-to-digital conversion ===
WMDT ended regular programming on its analog signal on September 22, 2008. This enabled work to conclude on relocating WMDT's digital signal from its pre-transition channel 53 to channel 47. WMDT relocated its signal from channel 47 to channel 29 on March 13, 2020, as a result of the 2016 United States wireless spectrum auction.

== See also ==
- Channel 29 digital TV stations in the United States
- Channel 47 virtual TV stations in the United States
