= No. 47 Squadron IAF =

No. 47 Squadron Black Archers
- No. 47 Squadron IAF "Black Archers"
- Active: 18 December 1959 – present
- Country: Republic of India
- Allegiance: Indian Armed Forces
- Branch: Indian Air Force
- Role: Fighter
- Garrison/HQ: Adampur AFS
- Nickname: "Black Archers"
- Mottos: Karmani Vyaprutham Dhanuhu; My bow is ready for task

Aircraft flown
- Fighter: Mig-29UPG

No. 47 Squadron IAF nicknamed as Black Archers is a fighter squadron equipped with MiG-29UPGs based at Adampur Air Force Station.

== History ==
No. 47 Squadron was raised on 18 December 1959 at Halwara with Sqn Ldr Denis Anthony La Fontaine as squadron commander. Air Vice Marshal S Subbaramu (that time Fg Offr) had ferried in the squadron's first Toofani the day before. Despite a shortage of personnel, equipment, working tools and other teething troubles, the infant squadron had the honor participating in the Republic Day flypast on 26 January 1960. And shortly thereafter in March 1960, the squadron took part in the 27th anniversary display at Bombay.

On 2 September 1965, five Toofanis were detached for the air defence of Tezpur. A further four aircraft were detached for the defence of Guwhati. The squadron was led in to these operation by Sqn Ldr P Venugopal and was appointed as SASO HQ (TC). A lone Toofani was left behind because of certain snags. The remaining crew of the squadron stayed back at Halwara for army co-operation in the Western sector.

On 23 March 1968, after a long stint in the East, the Black Archers exchanged the aging Toofanis for new MiG-21FLs at Chandigarh. In February 1969, the squadron was tasked with the air defence of Delhi and was relocated to Hindon. The squadron stayed here for the next two years.

The squadron took a very active part in the 1971 war against Pakistan. Although its primary mission was air defence and it flew a number of counter air missions over Badin airfield. The Squadron was led in these operations by Wg Cdr HS Gill VM. During the war the squadron stationed detachments at Jamnagar, Halwara, Palam and Hindon. The Jamnagar detachment was most active and has to its credit a confirmed Starfighter (F-104) kill and a further probable. On 12 December 1971, Sqn Ldr BB Soni shot down an F-104 as it attempted to attack Jamnagar.

In November 1973, the Black Archers moved to Halwara, its formation base. For next five years, the squadron stayed there. Its proximity of Sidhwan Khas range gave the opportunity to the pilots to hone their skills and achieve a high level of proficiency in air-to-ground work.

In January 1978, the squadron moved on to its new location at Chabua where it was to remain for the next seven years. In November 1980, Wg Cdr MS Vasudeva VM intercepted, identified and photographed an intruding Chinese IL-18. In May 1985 the Black Archers was relocated to Hashimara.

The squadron re-formed on MiG-29s at Pune in May 1987. While at Pune, the squadron underwent exhaustive training to prepare a viable pilot fleet for the new aircraft. Being the first to operate the MiG-29, the task of reviewing all the tactics and develop them for the sound operational effectiveness fell on the Black Archers. In February 1996, the squadron received new aircraft: four fighters and a trainer.

In March 1997, the squadron moved to Adampur under the command of Wg Cdr KP Nair. This move was completed in record time and the squadron was operational within 7 days of its coming to Adampur. During Kargil conflict the squadron went on full alert and deployed detachments as far as Jamnagar

2025 Operation Sindoor

During the 2025 India–Pakistan conflict the squadron was involved in direct surface to air engagements with Pakistani fighter jets. According to Indian claims, the S 400 air defence system shot down 6 JF-17, F-16 aircraft including a Saab 2000 AWE&C aircraft at a record distance of 314 km making it the longest surface to air kill ever. Group Captain Animesh Patni was awarded Vir Chakra for the historic air defence kill.

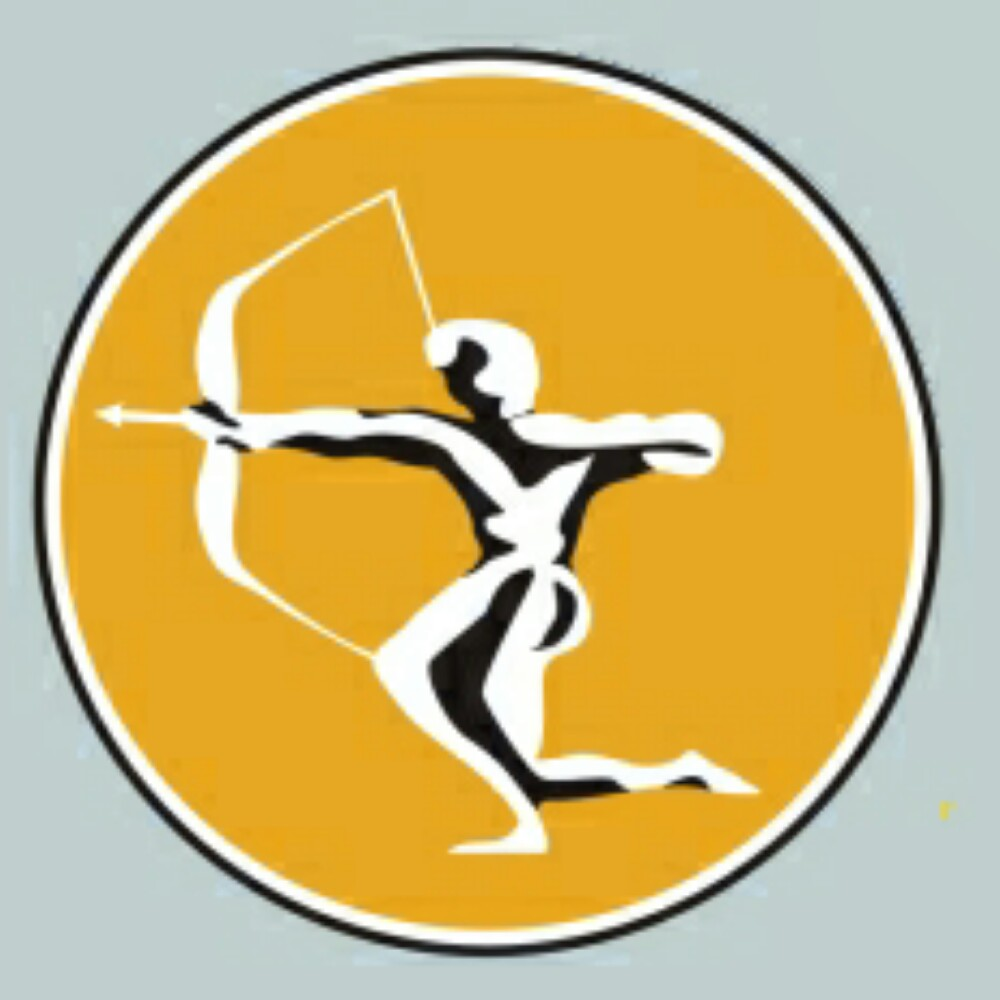
Standard logo used on Squadron's aircraft.

== Assignments ==
- Indo-Pakistani War of 1965
- Indo-Pakistani War of 1971

== Aircraft ==
Aircraft types operated by 47 Squadron
Aircraft type	From	To	Air base
Toofani	Dec 1959	Mar 1968	AFS Halwara
MiG-21 FL	Feb 1969	May 1987	AFS Chandigarh
MiG-29	Jun 1989	Till Date	AFS Adampur
