= Oregon Caves National Monument and Preserve =

National monument in Oregon, United States

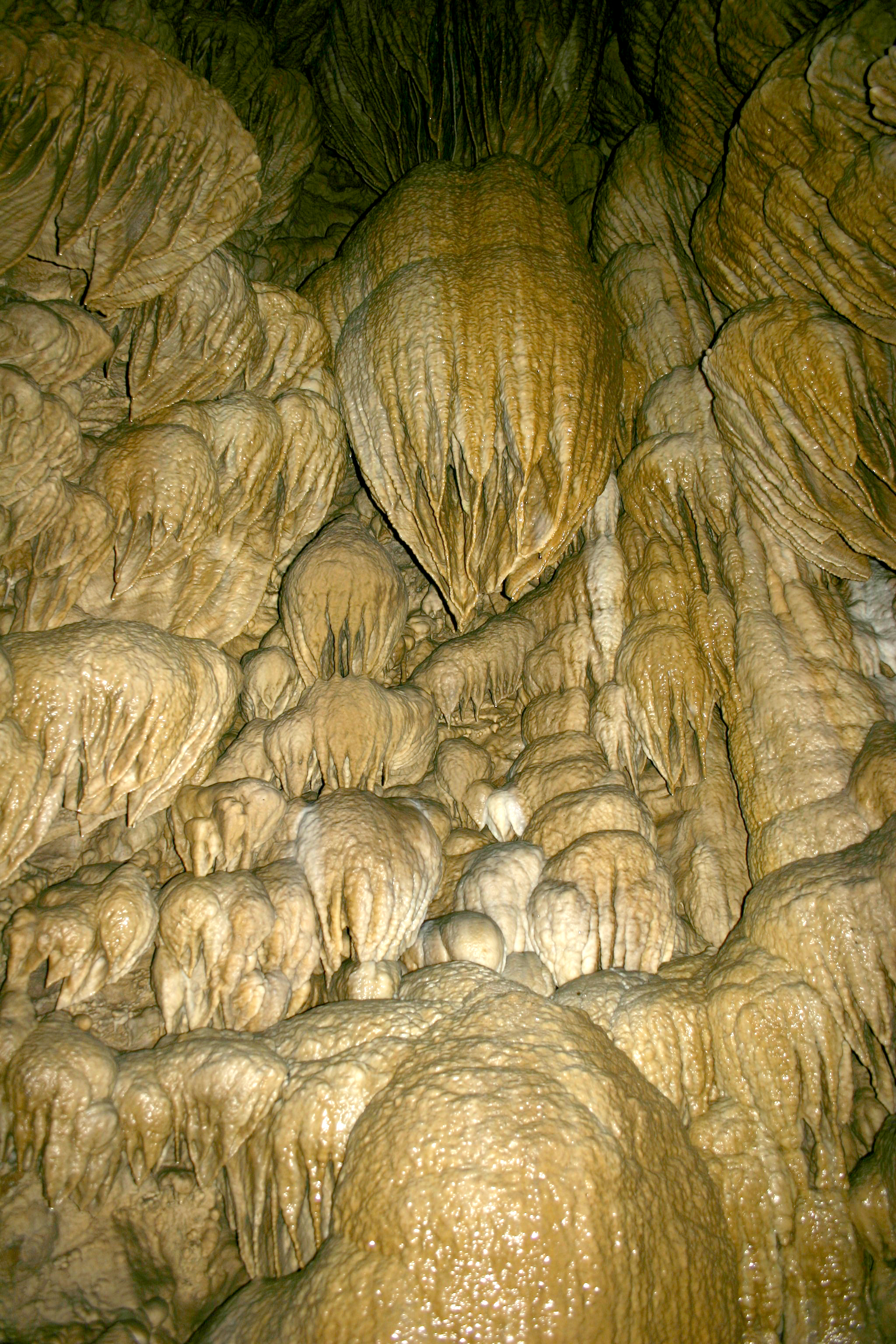
- Formations resembling drapery in a dome-shaped pit in Oregon Caves

- Location within Oregon Location within the United States
- Interactive map of Oregon Caves National Monument and Preserve
- Location: Cave Junction, Josephine, Oregon, United States
- Coordinates: 42°05′44″N 123°24′21″W
- Area: 4,554 acres (18.43 km^{2})
- Elevation: 4,377 ft (1,334 m)
- Established: July 12, 1909
- Visitors: 64,354 (in 2025)
- Governing body: National Park Service
- Website: Oregon Caves National Monument and Preserve

Oregon Caves National Monument and Preserve is a protected area in the northern Siskiyou Mountains of southwestern Oregon in the United States. The 4,554-acre (1,843 ha) park, including the marble cave, is 20 miles (32 km) east of Cave Junction, on Oregon Route 46. The protected area, managed by the National Park Service (NPS), is in southwestern Josephine County, near the Oregon–California border.

Elijah Davidson, a resident of nearby Williams, discovered the cave in 1874. Over the next two decades, private investors failed in efforts to run successful tourist ventures at the publicly owned site. After passage of the Antiquities Act by the United States Congress, in 1909 President William Howard Taft established Oregon Caves National Monument, to be managed by the United States Forest Service (USFS). The growing usage of the automobile, construction of paved highways, and promotion of tourism by boosters from Grants Pass led to large increases in cave visitation during the late 1920s and thereafter. Among the attractions at the remote monument is the Oregon Caves Chateau, a six-story hotel built in a rustic style in 1934. It is a National Historic Landmark and is part of the Oregon Caves Historic District within the monument. The NPS, which assumed control of the monument in 1933, offers tours of the cave from mid-April through early November. In 2014, the protected area was expanded by about 4,000 acres (1,600 ha) and re-designated a National Monument and Preserve. At the same time, the segment of the creek that flows through the cave was renamed for the mythological Styx and added to the National Wild and Scenic Rivers System.

Oregon Caves is a solutional cave, with passages totaling about 15,000 feet (4,600 m), formed in marble. The parent rock was originally limestone that metamorphosed to marble during the geologic processes that created the Klamath Mountains, including the Siskiyous. Although the limestone formed about 190 million years ago, the cave itself is no older than a few million years. Valued as a tourist cave, the cavern also has scientific value; sections of the cave that are not on tour routes contain fossils of national importance.

Activities at the park include cave touring, hiking, photography, and wildlife viewing. One of the park trails leads through the forest to Big Tree, which at 13 feet (4.0 m) is the widest Douglas fir known in Oregon. Lodging and food are available at The Chateau and in Cave Junction. Camping is available in the preserve at the Cave Creek Campground, at a local USFS campground, and private sites in the area.

== Geography ==
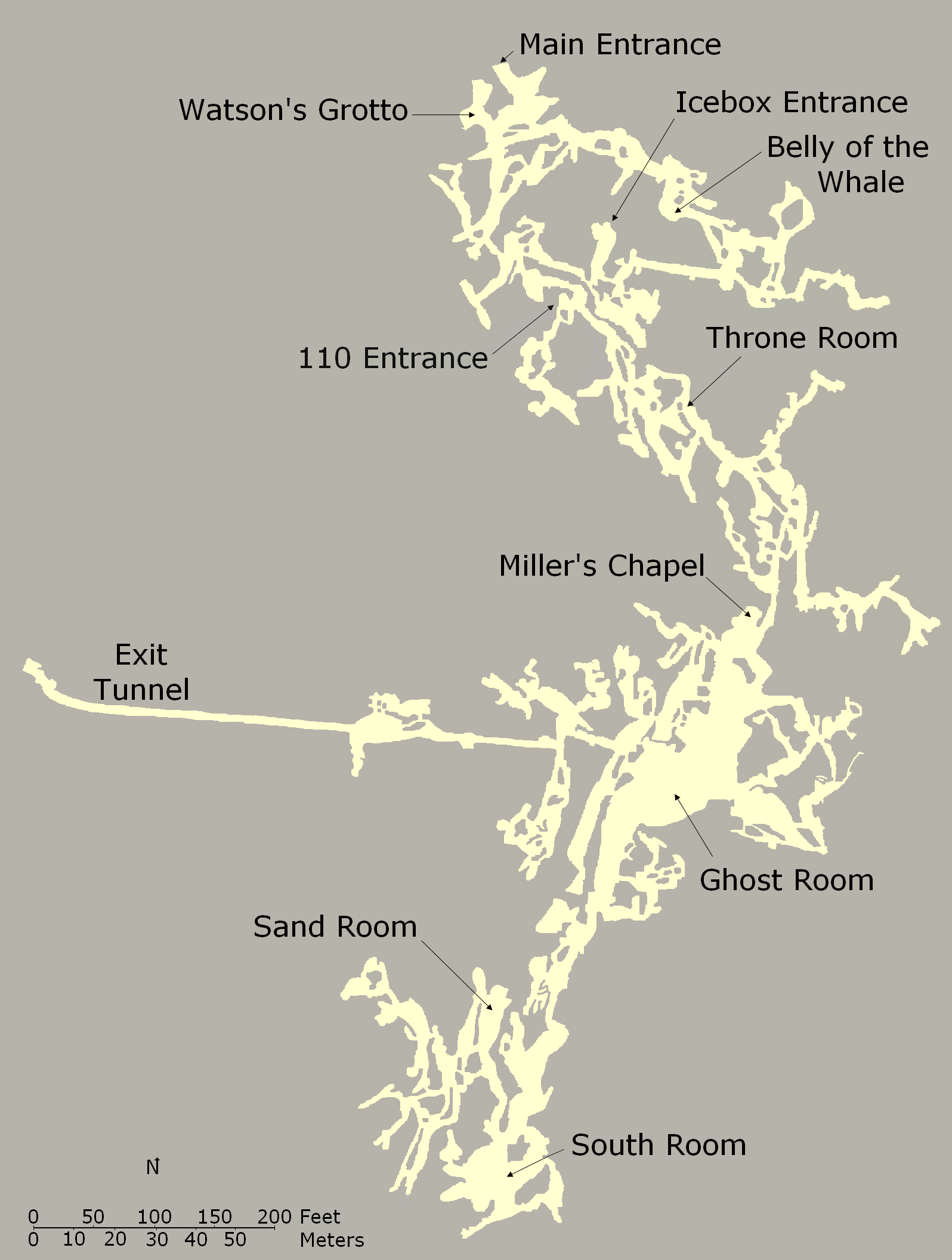
Map of the cave

Oregon Caves National Monument and Preserve is in the Siskiyou Mountains, a coastal range that is part of the Klamath Mountains of northwestern California and southwestern Oregon. The monument consists of 484 acres (196 ha) in the Rogue River – Siskiyou National Forest, about 6 miles (10 km) north of the Oregon–California border in Josephine County. Elevations within the monument range from 3,680 to 5,480 feet (1,120 to 1,670 m). Mount Elijah in the preserve rises to 6,390 feet (1,950 m).

In December 2014 as part of the National Defense Authorization Act for Fiscal Year 2015, the U.S. Congress enlarged the protected area that includes the cave and changed its name from Oregon Caves National Monument to Oregon Caves National Monument and Preserve. The preserve covers 4,070 acres (1,650 ha), and both it and the monument, which abuts the preserve, are administered by the same staff.

By highway, Oregon Caves is 55 miles (89 km) southwest of Grants Pass, 300 miles (480 km) south of Portland and 450 miles (720 km) north of San Francisco. The caves are 20 miles (32 km) east of the small city of Cave Junction via Oregon Route 46 off U.S. Route 199. The main cave has known passages totaling about 15,000 feet (4,600 m) in length. Eight separate smaller caves have also been discovered in the monument.

Runoff from the heavily wooded monument forms small headwater streams of the Illinois River, a major tributary of the Rogue River. One of five small springs in the monument becomes Upper Cave Creek, which flows on the surface before disappearing into its bed and entering the cave. Supplemented by water entering the cave from above, the stream emerges from the main entrance as Cave Creek. Within the cave, Cave Creek is known as the River Styx, named for the river Styx of Greek mythology connecting Earth to the Underworld. In late 2014, Congress added the River Styx to the National Wild and Scenic Rivers System, which added a level of protection aimed at keeping the stream free-flowing in perpetuity. It is the only subterranean river in the Wild Rivers system.

== History ==
Archeologists believe the first humans to inhabit the Rogue River region were nomadic hunters and gatherers. Radiocarbon dating suggests that they arrived in southwestern Oregon at least 8,500 years ago. At least 1,500 years before the first contact with whites, the natives established permanent villages along streams. Even so, no evidence has been found to suggest that any of the native peoples, such as the Takelma who lived along the Rogue and Applegate rivers in the 19th century, used the cave.

Largely bypassed by the early non-native explorers, fur traders, and settlers because of its remote location, the region attracted newcomers in quantity when prospectors found gold near Jacksonville in the Rogue River valley in 1851. This led to the creation of Jackson County in 1852 and, after gold discoveries near Waldo in the Illinois River valley, the creation of Josephine County, named for the daughter of a gold miner. Even with an influx of miners and of settlers who farmed donation land claims, Josephine County's population was only 1,204 in 1870.

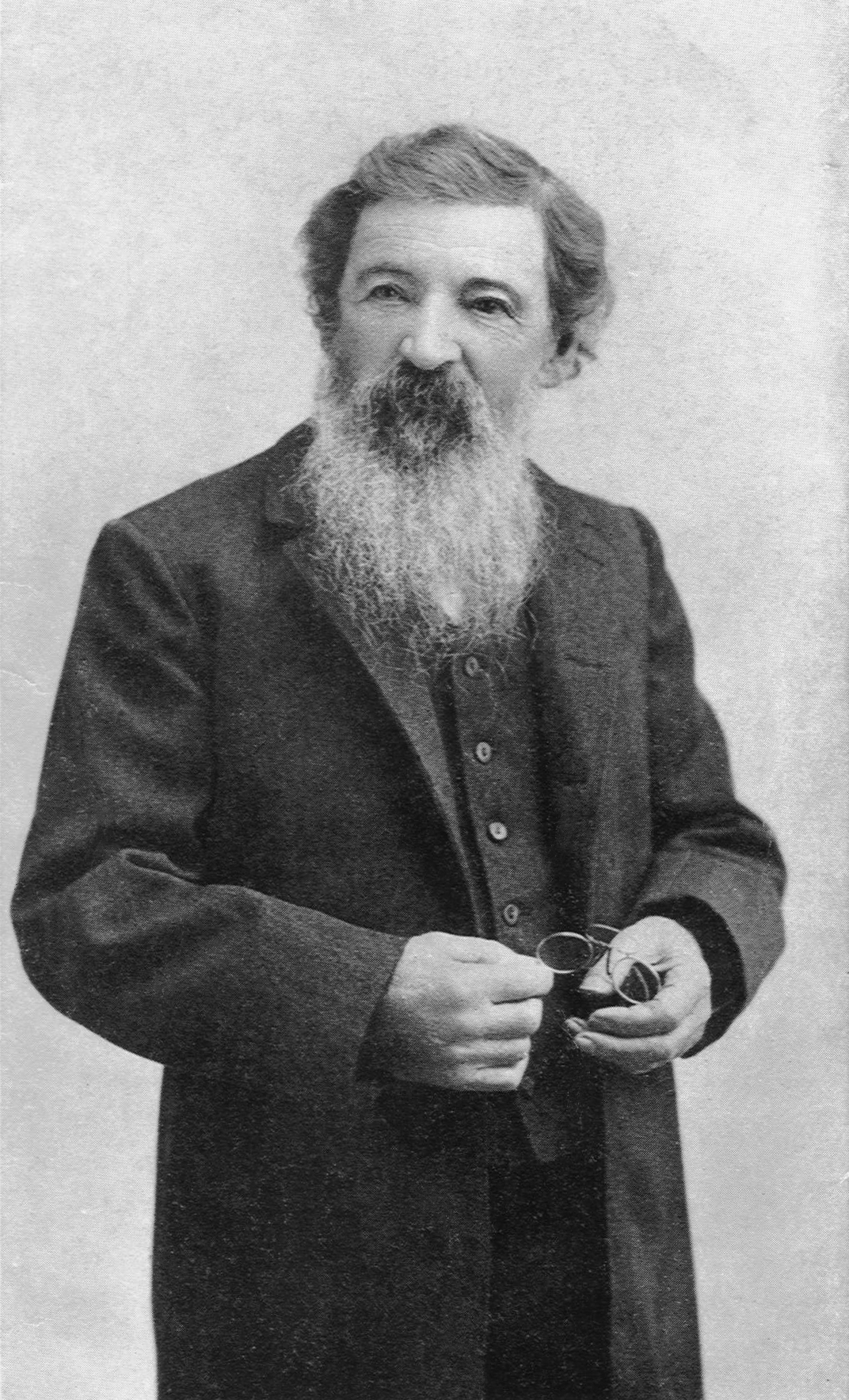
Thomas Condon, a University of Oregon geology professor who visited the cave with his students in 1884

Elijah Jones Davidson, who discovered the cave in 1874, had emigrated from Illinois to Oregon with his parents, who eventually settled along Williams Creek in Josephine County. Williams, as the community came to be called, is about 12 miles (19 km) northeast of the cave.

Only a few people visited the cave during the next decade. Among them was Thomas Condon, professor of geology at the University of Oregon. Guided by Davidson's brother, in 1884 he and a group of students hiked from Williams to the cavern, which they inspected by candlelight. Shortly thereafter, Walter Burch, an acquaintance of the Davidson family, tried to develop the cave as a business. Burch and his partners opened what they called Limestone Caves and charged visitors $1 each for a guided cave trip, a camping spot, pasture for horses, and cave water they described as medicinal. Although Burch and others hacked crude trails to the cave from Cave Junction and Williams, the trip was too difficult for most tourists, and Limestone Caves ceased operations in 1888.

In the early 1890s, the Oregon Caves Improvement Company, headed by Alfonso B. Smith of San Diego and two men from Kerby, Oregon, tried to raise capital for a larger tourist business at Oregon Caves. Smith made outlandish claims about the cave and its business potential, saying that it was 22 miles (35 km) long, that an ordinary horse and buggy could be driven through 10 miles (16 km) of it, that it had 600 separate chambers, and that the company planned to build something like a streetcar line from Williams to the cave. Smith succeeded in wooing The San Francisco Examiner, which twice sent reporters to the site. On the second visit, there was "an orgy of destruction" in which passages were widened, formations broken or deliberately removed, and directional arrows added to the cave walls. After Smith had spent all of the company's money and borrowed more in its name, he disappeared in 1894, and the business collapsed.

Neither Burch nor Smith had owned the cave or the land around it, which belonged to the public. Beginning in the 1890s, the Federal government began regulating the use of public lands like these. In 1903, President Theodore Roosevelt designated millions of acres of forest lands for protection, including what became Siskiyou National Forest, which surrounds the cave. The USFS was created in 1905 to manage these reserves. Three years later, Congress passed the Antiquities Act, which allowed the President to designate protected areas called National Monuments on public lands. In 1909, President William Howard Taft established Oregon Caves National Monument, to be managed by the USFS. A year later the USFS employed men to guard the cave and to serve as tour guides.

Isolated and difficult to reach, the monument initially attracted few visitors, by 1920 only 1,800 for the year. The situation changed markedly when large numbers of Americans began to travel by automobile on roads paid for largely with government funds. One highway connected Grants Pass with the California coast at Crescent City. Another new road, the Oregon Caves Highway, led from the Grants Pass – Crescent City highway to the cave. Campaigns to attract car-driving tourists included those of the Cavemen, a booster group from Grants Pass that dressed in animal skins, posed along tour routes, and staged annual events to promote the monument. (Note: In 1931, the Cavemen dedicated Caveman Bridge over the Rogue River in Grants Pass. The bridge marks the northern end of the Redwood Highway (U.S. Route 199), which connects Grants Pass with Cave Junction and the Oregon Caves Highway. Grants Pass High School uses "Cavemen" as its mascot name.) By 1928, the number of visitors to the cave had risen to about 24,000 a year.

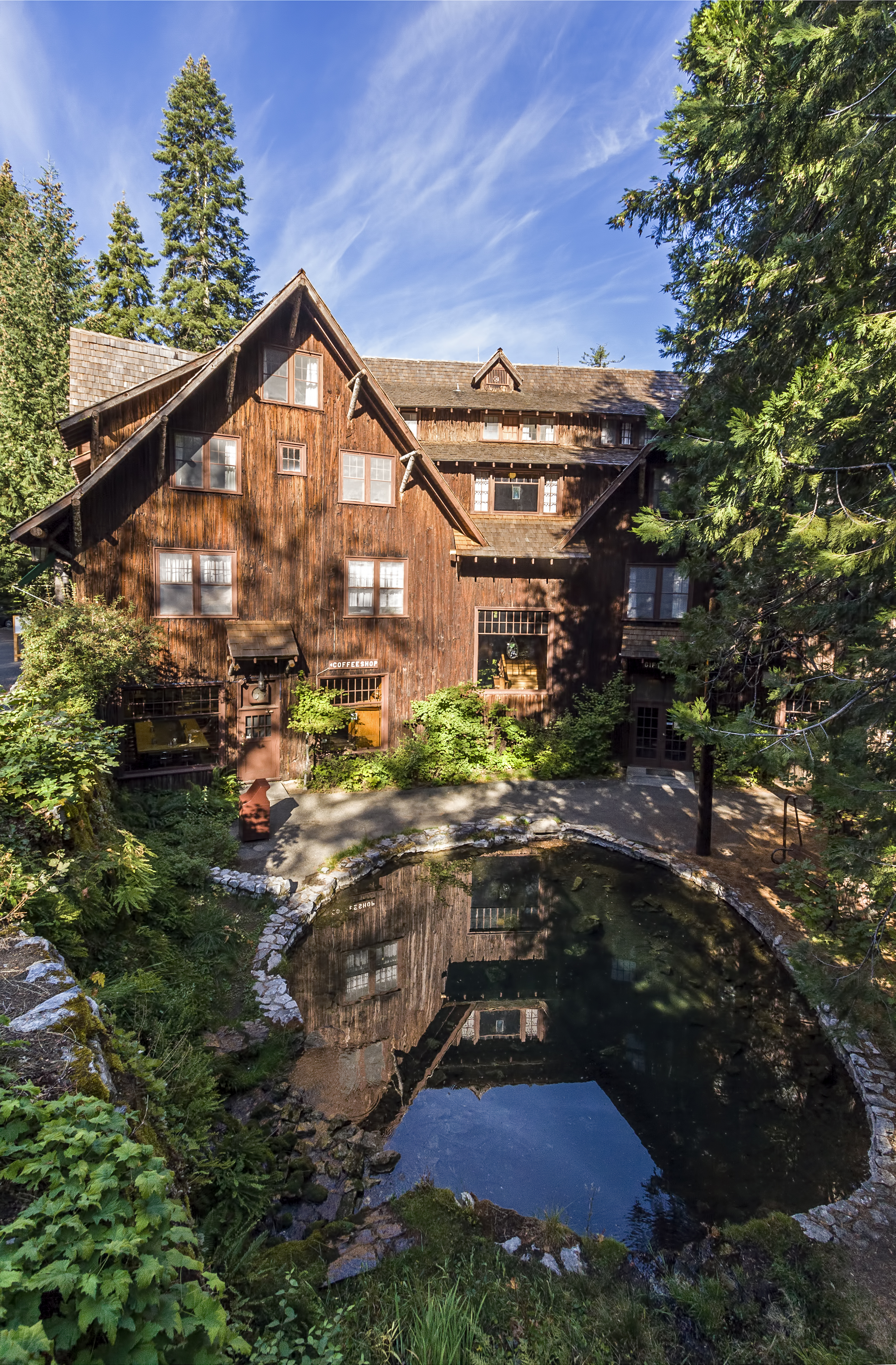
The Chateau in 2009

The visitors' need for overnight lodging led to creation of public and private campsites and rustic cabins along highways near Cave Junction and the monument. In 1923, the USFS signed a contract with the Oregon Caves Company, based in Grants Pass, to run the cave tours and improve the park accommodations. Public-private partnerships between the USFS or NPS and concessionaires continued in various forms at Oregon Caves into the 21st century. The Chalet, a building with a kitchen, dining room, gift shop, ticket sales area, and a dormitory for women on the Oregon Caves Company staff, was completed later that year. Three years later, the company added seven two-bedroom cabins for tourists and a dormitory for male employees. In 1928, an Oregon Caves bill written by the USFS and introduced by Senator Charles McNary of Oregon won Congressional approval. It provided funds for electric lights, a power plant, a system of pipes and hoses to wash mud from the cave, (Note: Historian Stephen R. Mark speculates that concern about mud "was likely based on how the Edenic ideal did not include dirty formations and inconvenience to visitors.") and an artificial exit tunnel to eliminate the crowding that occurred when two groups on round-trip tours had to pass one another. The 500-foot (150 m) tunnel was completed in 1931.

Management of the monument was transferred from the Forest Service to the NPS in 1933, and a six-story hotel, the Oregon Caves Chateau, was completed at the site in 1934. Gust Lium, a builder from Grants Pass, oversaw construction of the Chateau and some of the park's other buildings, which he designed in a rustic style. Mason Manufacturing of Los Angeles produced the Chateau's furniture in a style called Monterey, valued in the 21st century at up to $5,000 for a single chair. During the 1930s and early 1940s, the Civilian Conservation Corps (CCC) installed water and telephone lines, improved trails, and worked on landscaping at the park. The Chalet was rebuilt in 1942 to include a third story and a larger dormitory for women.

Although the Chateau suffered $100,000 in damage from a 1964 flood, it was repaired. By 1968, a total of one million people had visited the cave. In 1987, the Chateau was declared a National Historic Landmark, and in 1992, 60 acres (24 ha) of the monument, including the Chateau and other rustic structures, were listed as the Oregon Caves Historic District on the National Register of Historic Places. In 2001, the NPS began running the cave tours formerly offered by private contractors, and two years later all the structures at the monument became public property managed by the NPS. The Illinois Valley Community Development Organization (IVCDO), a non-profit organization based in Cave Junction, runs the monument's gift shop.

In 2014, the protected area was expanded by 4,070 acres (1,650 ha) that was transferred from the Rogue River – Siskiyou National Forest to create the National Monument and Preserve. The preserve consists of forest, subalpine meadows, mountains, and creeks formerly managed by the USFS and now by the NPS. Named features within the addition include Mount Elijah (6,390 ft or 1,950 m), Bigelow Lake, and a network of existing trails linked to the monument trails. Although hunting is allowed in the preserve but not in the monument, the new arrangement seeks to end cattle grazing in the Cave Creek – River Styx watershed.

== Geology and paleontology ==
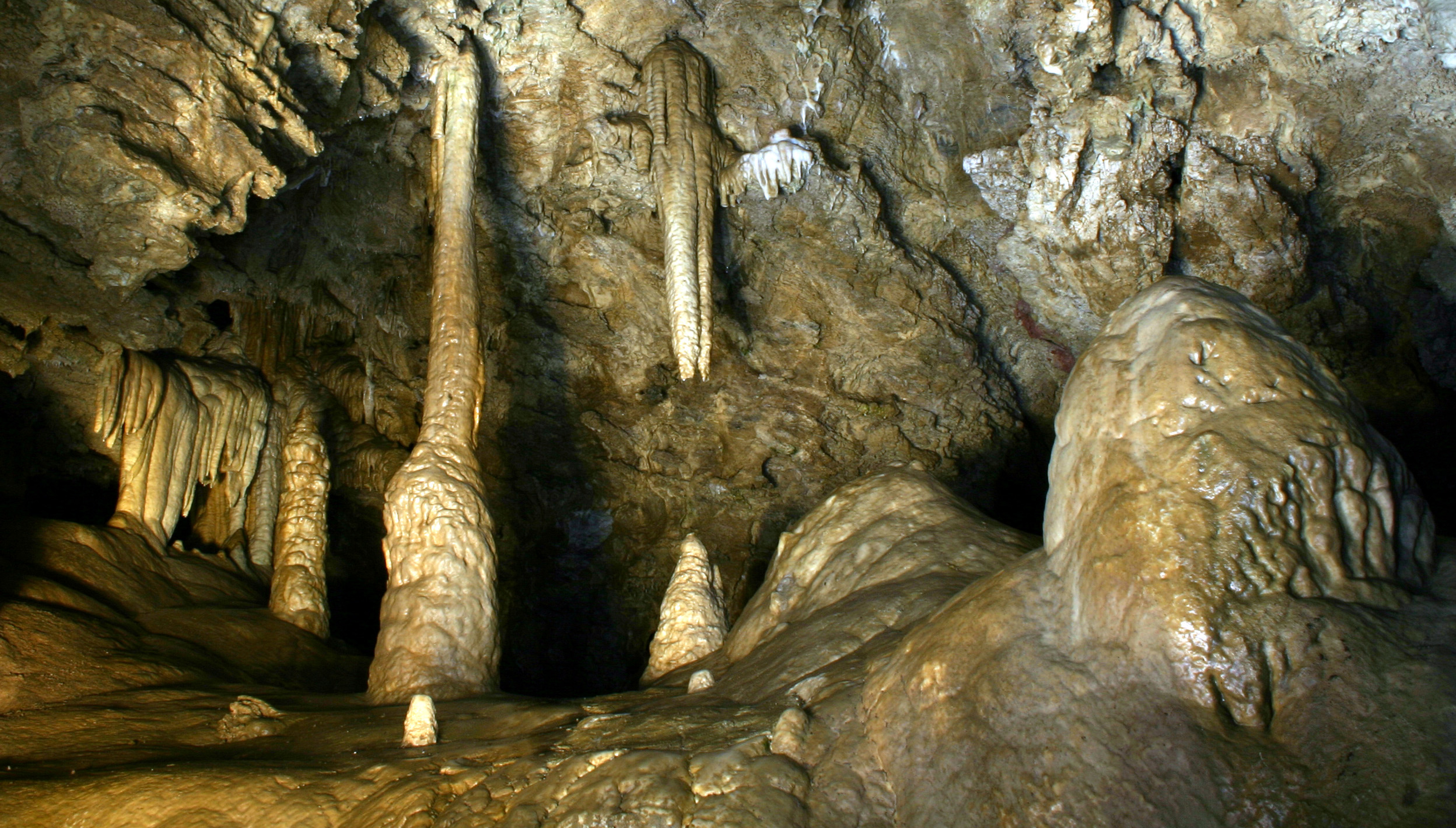
Stalactites, stalagmites, and column in Miller's Chapel

Most caves created from dissolved rocks are formed in limestone or dolomite, but Oregon Caves was formed in marble. Of the more than 3,900 cave systems managed by the NPS, only those in Oregon Caves National Monument and Preserve, Sequoia National Park, Kings Canyon National Park, and Great Basin National Park have marble caves. (Note: Eighty one parks managed by the NPS have caves. Not all are solution caves formed by dissolving of rock. Some are lava caves, others are talus caves formed by rocks falling atop narrow crevices, and some are sea caves. Lava Beds National Monument alone has more than 450 separate lava caves.)

The parent rock in which the cave developed was formed about 190 million years ago as limestone that was part of a tectonic plate beneath the Pacific Ocean. Granitic plutons intruded this part of the ocean crust, the Applegate terrane, about 160 million years ago. As the oceanic crust carrying the terrane subducted under the North American plate, the terrane accreted onto the North American Plate and the limestone was subjected to heat and pressure that metamorphosed it to marble. Further tectonic movements eventually lifted the marble to about 4,000 feet (1,200 m) above sea level. The marble block containing the cave is at least 1,080 feet (330 m) long, 490 feet (150 m) wide, and about 390 feet (120 m) high.

The cave's creation took place long after the marble formed. As groundwater seeped into cracks in the marble, it eventually dissolved enough rock to expand some of the cracks to the size of tunnels. Generally, the age of a cave cannot be determined directly because the cave itself is an empty space, but scientists can sometimes determine the age of speleothems or sediments in a cave. An early 21st-century study of speleothem development in Oregon Caves focused on the past 380,000 years. Based on the available evidence, the cave is thought to be at least a million years old and "probably not much older than a few million" years.

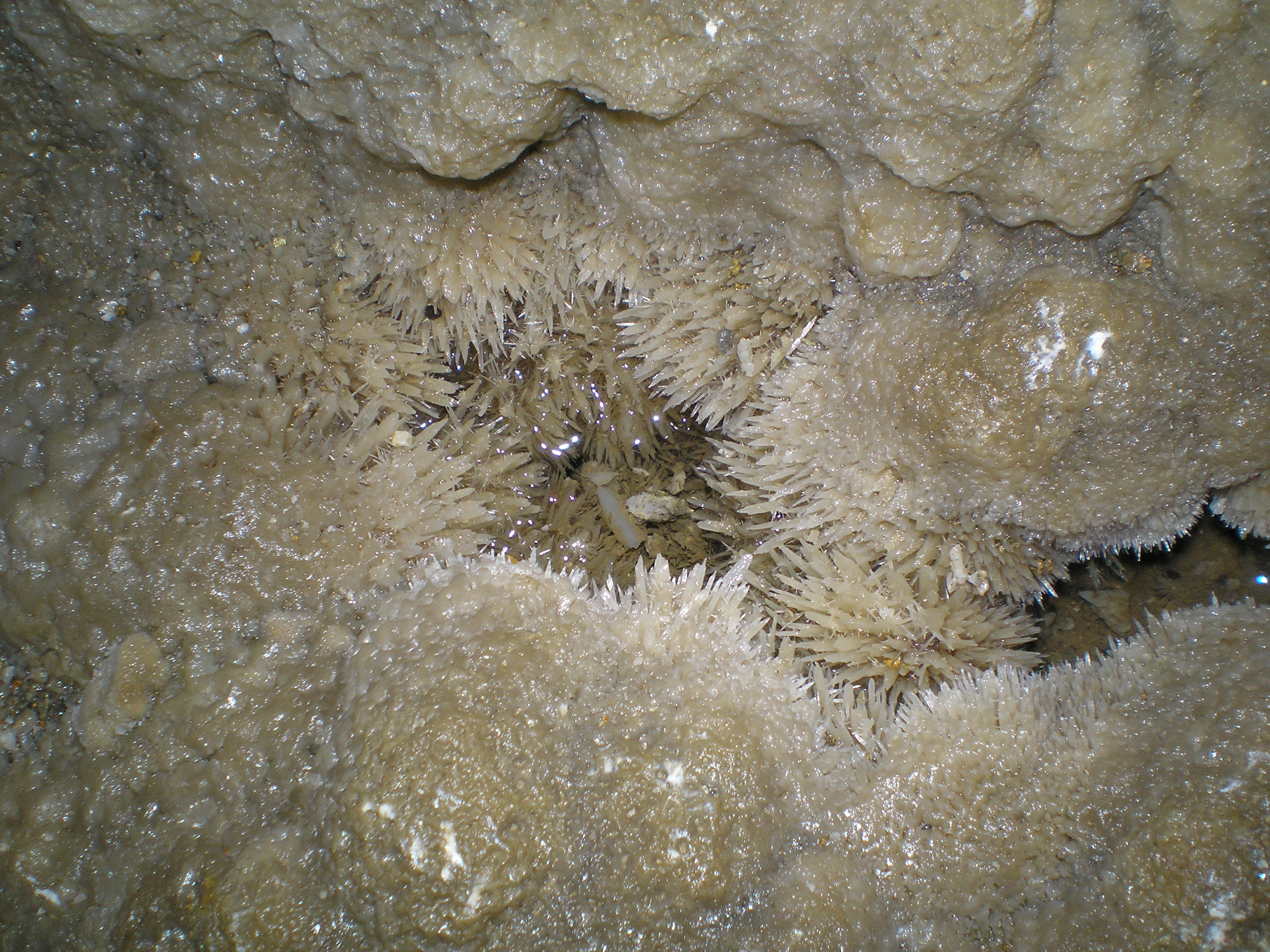
Calcite crystals in Oregon Caves

Marble has a more coarse-grained texture than limestone, but both are made of calcite (CaCO_{3}). Caves often develop when slightly acidic groundwater dissolves calcite along natural fractures in the rock. A reversal of the dissolving process can create flowstone and dripstone such as stalactites, which hang from cave ceilings like icicles, and stalagmites, cone-shaped masses that form on cave floors, usually directly below stalactites. These structures form when acidic groundwater with a high concentration of dissolved calcite drips slowly from the ceiling of an air-filled cave, becomes less acidic, and leaves some of its calcite behind as a solid precipitate. Oregon Caves includes a variety of cave formations created through precipitation of calcite. (Note: The chemical equation for the process is H_{2}O + CO_{2} + CaCO_{3} $\rightleftarrows$ Ca^{++} + 2HCO_{3}^{−}; that is, water plus carbon dioxide plus calcite can yield calcium ions plus bicarbonate ions and vice versa. The carbon dioxide can either be acquired from the atmosphere (or soils), making the water more acidic, or it can be released to the atmosphere, making the water less acidic. The equation is read from left to right for cave formation (dissolution) and from right to left for flowstone and dripstone formation (precipitation).) Although many of the speleothems in the public sections of the cave have been broken, discolored by human skin oils, or otherwise damaged, the narrow twisting passages of the "show cave" have been largely preserved.

The cave is not pure marble. Streams have deposited silts and gravels from the surface. Dikes of diorite, an igneous rock that was part of a pluton, and shales and sandstones, sedimentary rocks interbedded with the marble, are part of the cave.

The monument has more than 50 paleontological sites ranging in age from Late Pleistocene to Holocene. A fossil of a grizzly bear more than 50,000 years old and a jaguar fossil between 40,000 and 20,000 years old have been found in the cave. Other fossils include amphibians, and rare finds of the mountain beaver and the blue grouse. The monument's mammalian fossils, found in non-public sections of the cave, are of national significance.

== Climate ==
The monument is in the mountains at elevations varying from 3,680 to 5,480 feet (1,120 to 1,670 m) above sea level. The park's nearness to the ocean contributes to its relatively mild climate. Temperatures generally range between 20 and 40 °F (−7 and 4 °C) in winter and 50 and 90 °F (10 and 32 °C) in summer. Inside the cave the temperature is always about 44 °F (7 °C). (Note: The transition zones near the cave's entrances are exceptions. For example, icicles sometimes form in below-freezing temperatures at the mouth of the main entrance.) Annual precipitation, arriving mostly as wet snow, averages 55 inches (1,400 mm). Moderate winds are common.

== Flora and fauna ==
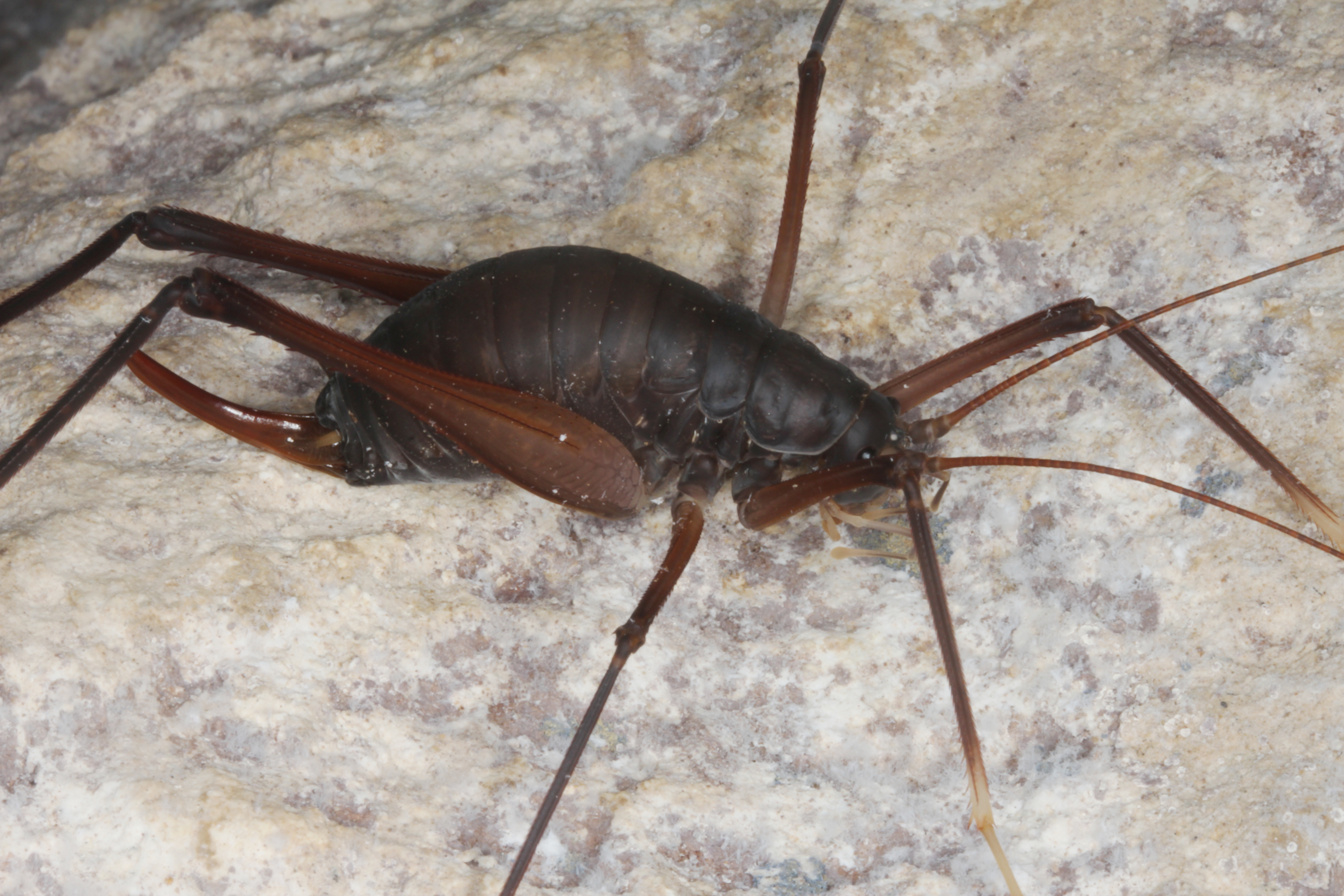
Cave cricket in Oregon Caves

Located within the Klamath–Siskiyou region, known for its high biodiversity, the monument supports 391 vascular plant species as well as many species of bryophyte, lichen, and macrofungi. Trees in the monument include Douglas fir, oak, white fir, and alder. Among the oldest trees is Big Tree, thought to be the widest Douglas fir in the state. It is 41 feet (12 m) in circumference near the base. Its age is estimated at 600 to 800 years, and it was described in the 1930s as 14 feet (4.3 m) in diameter. (Note: Calculated using a circumference, c, of 41 feet (12 m) in the formula c = π × d, where π is rounded to 3.14, and the diameter, d, is about 13 feet (4.0 m).) The monument contains no plants with special conservation status.

Species lists for the park include about 50 mammals, 86 birds, 11 reptiles and amphibians, 8 bats, more than 200 arthropods, 8 snails and slugs, 75 butterflies, more than 55 moths, and 8 aquatic macroinvertebrates. Of these species, 160 are found inside the cave. Outside the cave, the black-tailed deer, Steller's jay, the common raven, and Townsend's chipmunk are among animals often seen in the park. Less commonly sighted are the black bear, cougar, northern flying squirrel, and Pacific giant salamander. Springs and other wet places support flatworms, frogs, and snails.

Animal species in the park with special conservation status are the northern spotted owl, California mountain kingsnake, tailed frog, Del Norte salamander, northern goshawk, olive-sided flycatcher, little willow flycatcher, Siskiyou gazelle beetle, and Pacific fisher. Five at-risk bat species are found in the cave: Townsend's big-eared bat, and the long-eared, fringed, long-legged, and Yuma myotis.

== Recreation and lodging ==
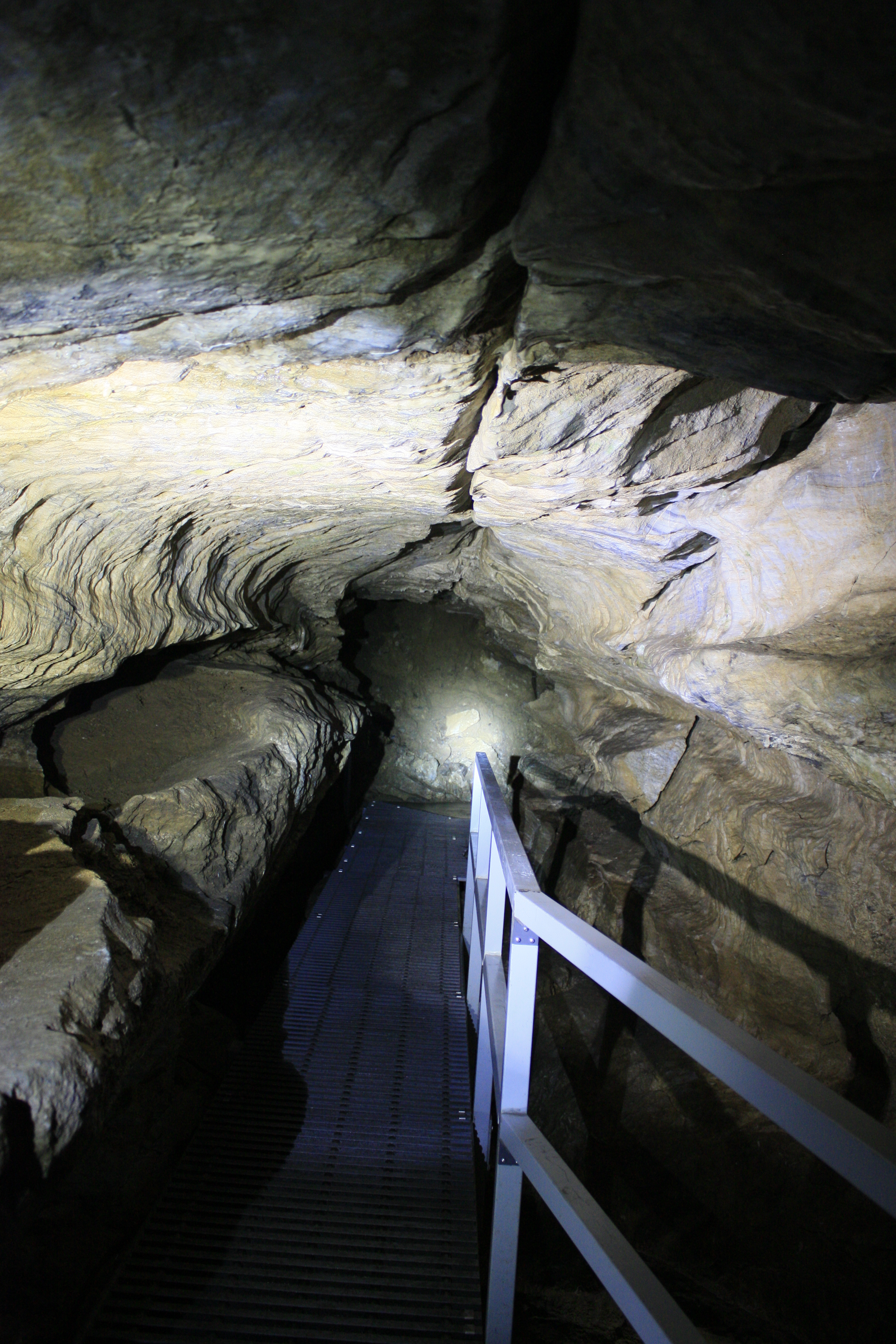
Walkway through Belly of the Whale

Oregon Caves National Monument and Preserve is open year-round, although snow sometimes blocks the road to the park, and the visitor center is open when the cave is open for tours. Cave tours are usually offered from mid-April to early November, but the schedule depends in spring and fall on weather conditions. The Illinois Valley Visitor Center in Cave Junction, managed by the IVCDO under an NPS contract, also has information about the cave.

Cave-tour tickets are available online through the Recreation.gov website, and a limited number of tour tickets may sometimes be had first-come, first-served. Tours vary in length and duration. The basic ranger-guided "discovery cave tour", 90 minutes long, requires negotiating more than 500 steep and uneven stairs and passageways with as little as 45 inches (110 cm) between floor and ceiling. Not recommended by the NPS for anyone with heart, lung, or mobility problems, the tour involves a total climb of 230 feet (70 m). Children under 42 inches (110 cm) tall or who are unable to climb a set of test stairs on their own are not allowed on the full cave tour. The NPS offers a limited number of off-trail "introduction to caving" tours by reservation only.

Since the cave is only 44 °F (7 °C) inside regardless of the outdoor temperature, the NPS recommends warm clothing for its tours. Good walking shoes are needed to negotiate slippery and uneven surfaces. Not allowed on the tours are flashlights, backpacks, large purses, tripods, or pets. To protect bats from white nose syndrome, visitors must not take any clothing or equipment into Oregon Caves that have previously entered any other cave or mine.

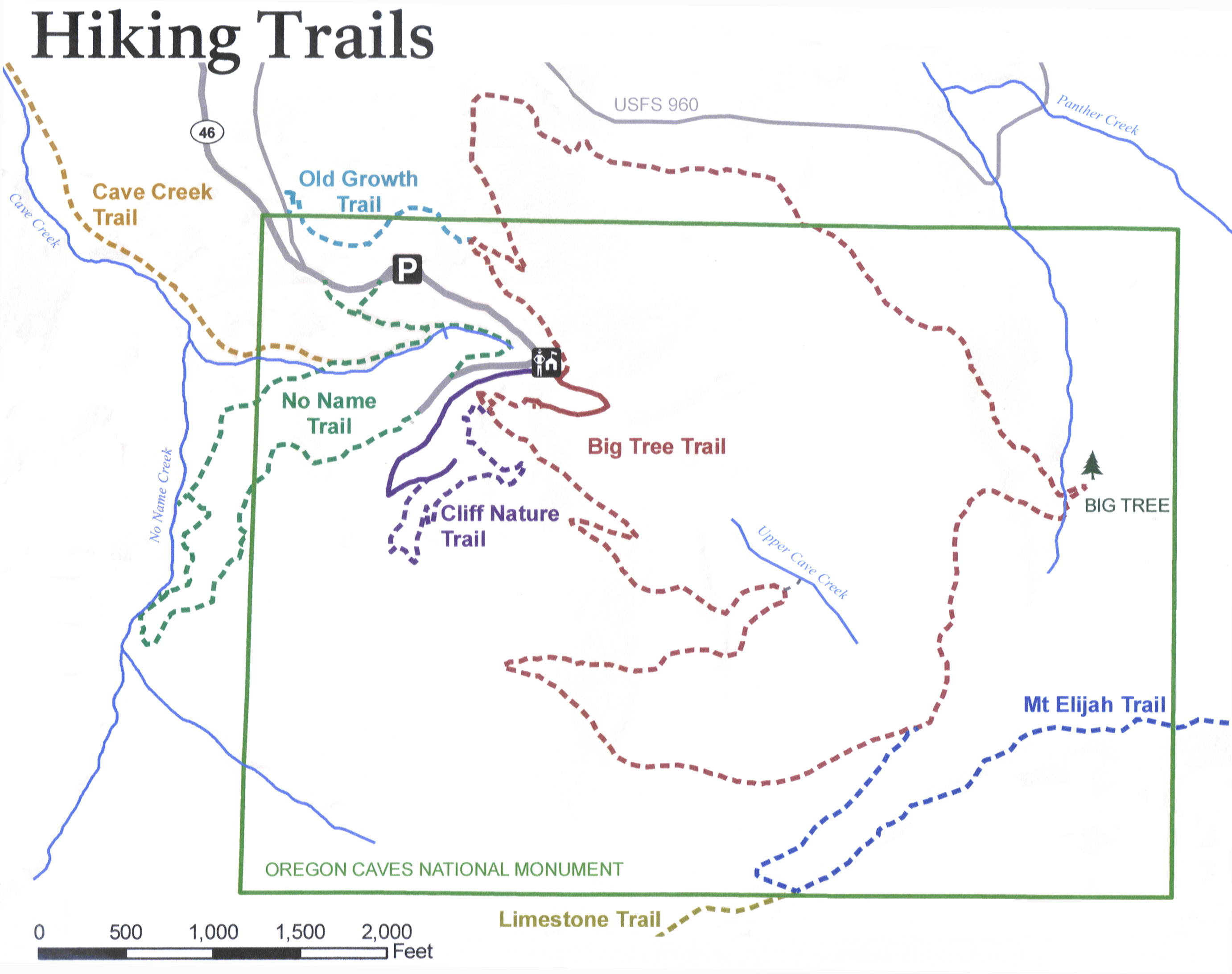
Park trail map. "P" identifies the parking lot for the hotel and visitor center, represented by the ranger and small hut icon.

Lodging is available in the monument at the Chateau, which has 23 rooms to rent. Several hiking trails wind through the monument and adjacent forest lands. Big Tree Trail, 3.3 miles (5.3 km) long, gains 1,100 feet (340 m) in elevation between the visitor center and Big Tree. No Name Trail, 1.3 miles (2.1 km) long, begins behind the visitor center, follows Cave Creek, crosses it, and then climbs steeply to the west side of the monument. Two short side trails lead from the main trail to waterfalls along No Name Creek. Cliff Nature Trail, passing over marble outcrops and through fir forests, winds for about 1 mile (1.6 km) from near the cave entrance past the cave exit to Big Tree Trail. Old Growth Trail, 0.8 miles (1.3 km) long, links the Chateau and visitor center to the main parking lot. Other named trails entering the park include Cave Creek, Mt. Elijah, and Limestone. In 2012, the Oregon Caves Historic District was expanded to include several segments of the trail system.

Hotels, bed and breakfasts, motels, and resorts in the vicinity offer a variety of accommodations. Although no camping is allowed in the monument, the NPS maintains the Cave Creek Campground within the preserve. Additionally, the USFS maintains a campground nearby, and there are private campgrounds and recreational vehicle parks in the vicinity. The Chateau, generally open from early May to late October, has a restaurant, coffee shop, and delicatessen, and Cave Junction has several restaurants. The monument grounds include several picnic tables.

== See also ==
- List of national monuments of the United States

== Sources ==
- Bishop, Ellen Morris (2004). Hiking Oregon's Geology (2nd ed.). Seattle: The Mountaineers Books. ISBN 0-89886-847-5.
- Douthit, Nathan (2002). Uncertain Encounters: Indians and Whites at Peace and War in Southern Oregon. Corvallis: Oregon State University Press. ISBN 0-87071-549-6.
- Halliday, William R. (2006). "Geology of Oregon Cave Revisited". In Oliphant, Joe; Oliphant, Tina (eds.). Alpine Karst Volume 2. Dayton, Ohio: Cave Books. ISBN 978-0-939748-64-8.
- Halliday, William R. (2009). "Oregon and Washington". In Palmer, A. N.; Palmer, M. V. (eds.). Caves and Karst of the USA. Huntsville, Alabama: National Speleological Society. ISBN 978-1-879961-28-9.
- Mark, Stephen R. (2006). Domain of the Cavemen: A Historic Resource Study of Oregon Caves National Monument. Seattle: National Park Service, Pacific West Region. ISBN 978-0-16-077093-7. Archived from the original on October 24, 2012.
- Orr, Elizabeth L.; Orr, William N. (1999). Geology of Oregon (5th ed.). Dubuque, Iowa: Kendall/Hunt Publishing Company. ISBN 0-7872-6608-6.
- Plummer, Charles C.; McGeary, David (1988). Physical Geology (4th ed.). Dubuque, Iowa: Wm. C. Brown Publishers. ISBN 0-697-05092-0.
