= Channel 47 TV stations in Canada =

The following television stations formerly broadcast on digital or analog channel 47 in Canada:

- CBXFT-DT in Edmonton, Alberta
- CFHD-DT in Montreal, Quebec
- CFMT-DT in Toronto, Ontario
- CHNU-DT in Fraser Valley, British Columbia
- CJOH-TV-47 in Pembroke, Ontario
