= S400 =

S400 may refer to:

- S-400 missile system, a Russian anti-aircraft weapon system
- S400 (rocket engine), an ArianeGroup rocket engine
- Canon S400, a camera
- PV-S400 Plus, a Casio Pocket Viewer
- S400, or FireWire 400 computer port
- Mercedes-Benz S400 BlueHYBRID, a car
