= Infantry Regiment "Palma" No. 47 =

Coat of arms of the Infantry Regiment "Palma" No. 47

The Infantry Regiment "Palma" No. 47 is an infantry regiment in the Spanish Army.

Created in Tortosa by the Royal Decree of 27 July 1877, with the designation Infantry Regiment "Filipinas" No.52, named after the Philippines, it was raised from the 44th Tarragona and 73rd Lorca Reserve Battalions, which constituted its first and second Battalions. The new Regiment stayed in Catalonia with detachments in Lleida, la Seu d'Urgell, Tremp, and Solsona. In July 1880, the First Battalion moved to Palma, stationed in Carmen Barracks, and the second to Mahón. During the same month, the latter joined its Staff in Palma. From the beginning the Regiment maintained detachments in Ibiza and Cabrera.

In 1944 Regimental Colors donated by the Most Excellent City Council of Palma were officially consecrated in a Presentation of Colours ceremony. In April 1968 it was moved to General Asensio Base.

It participated, with attached units, in peacekeeping operations in Bosnia, Kosovo, and Iraq.

Today it is organized into:

- Regimental HQ
- Regimental Staff and Support
- Motorized Infantry Battalion "Philippines" No.I/47
