= Channel 47 digital TV stations in the United States =

The following television stations broadcast on digital channel 47 in the United States:

- K47JC-D in Wadena, Minnesota, to move to channel 22, on virtual channel 47
- K47JE-D in Olivia, Minnesota, to move to channel 15, on virtual channel 47
- K47JK-D in Pocatello, Idaho, to move to channel 20
- KWCC-LD in Wenatchee, Washington, to move to channel 25
- KWWO-LD in Walla Walla, Washington, to move to channel 32

The following stations, which are no longer licensed, formerly broadcast on digital channel 47:

- K47BP-D in Follett, Texas
- K47GM-D in New Mobeetie, Texas
- K47LM-D in Prineville, etc., Oregon
- KKNF-LD in Lufkin, Texas
- KLPN-LD in Longview, Texas
- W47DM-D in Cullowhee, North Carolina
- W47DX-D in Canovanas, Puerto Rico
- WEKK-LD in Wausau, Wisconsin
