= Channel 47 virtual TV stations in the United States =

The following television stations operate on virtual channel 47 in the United States:

- K09YZ-D in Beeville-Refugio, Texas
- K13IB-D in Glasgow, Montana
- K13JO-D in Hinsdale, Montana
- K16EJ-D in Peetz, Colorado
- K17EU-D in Holyoke, Colorado
- K17IL-D in Ellensburg, etc., Washington
- K17OA-D in Wray, Colorado
- K18AD-D in East Wenatchee, etc., Washington
- K18FO-D in Idalia, Colorado
- K18MS-D in Akron, Colorado
- K20MH-D in Duncan, Oklahoma
- K20MM-D in New Orleans, Louisiana
- K21NZ-D in Anton, Colorado
- K22JA-D in Corpus Christi, Texas
- K23OM-D in Victorville, California
- K26OT-D in Akron, Colorado
- K29LR-D in Baton Rouge, Louisiana
- K30OC-D in Cottage Grove, Oregon
- K30QB-D in Shreveport, Louisiana
- K30QG-D in Alexandria, Louisiana
- K31KK-D in Kingsville-Alice, Texas
- K33PA-D in Sterling, Colorado
- K33PU-D in Yuma, Colorado
- K34AC-D in Yuma, Colorado
- K35FI-D in Akron, Colorado
- K35MV-D in Concho, Oklahoma
- K35OK-D in Julesburg, Colorado
- K47JC-D in Wadena, Minnesota
- K47JE-D in Olivia, Minnesota
- K47JK-D in Pocatello, Idaho
- KCNH-LD in Joplin, Missouri
- KEBK-LD in Bakersfield, California
- KFMS-LD in Sacramento, California
- KGPE in Fresno, California
- KGSC-LD in Cheyenne, Wyoming
- KQUP-LD in Spokane, Washington
- KSSJ-LD in San Antonio, Texas
- KTMD in Galveston, Texas
- KTNP-LD in Colorado Springs, Colorado
- KTXD-TV in Greenville, Texas
- KUNP-LD in Portland, Oregon
- KWCC-LD in Wenatchee, Washington
- KWHB in Tulsa, Oklahoma
- KWWO-LD in Walla Walla, Washington
- KXLT-TV in Rochester, Minnesota
- KYVE in Yakima, Washington
- W16DS-D in Birmingham, Alabama
- W36EY-D in Berwick, Pennsylvania
- WATV-LD in Orlando, Florida
- WBXI-CD in Indianapolis, Indiana
- WEEV-LD in Evansville, Indiana
- WEWF-LD in Jupiter, Florida
- WIEF-LD in Augusta, Georgia
- WJAX-TV in Jacksonville, Florida
- WKBS-TV in Altoona, Pennsylvania
- WKTB-CD in Norcross, Georgia
- WMDO-CD in Washington, D.C.
- WMDT in Salisbury, Maryland
- WMSN-TV in Madison, Wisconsin
- WNJU in Linden, New Jersey
- WOIL-CD in Talladega, Alabama
- WPEM-LD in Lumberton, North Carolina
- WRLM in Canton, Ohio
- WRPX-TV in Rocky Mount, North Carolina
- WSYM-TV in Lansing, Michigan
- WTVP in Peoria, Illinois
- WUTH-CD in Hartford, Connecticut
- WYCH-LD in Rockford, Illinois
- WYKE-CD in Inglis/Yankeetown, Florida
- WZRB in Columbia, South Carolina

The following stations, which are no longer licensed, formerly operated on virtual channel 47:

- KKNF-LD in Lufkin, Texas
- KLPN-LD in Longview, Texas
- W47DX-D in Canovanas, Puerto Rico
- W48DT-D in Guayanilla, Puerto Rico
- WBAX-LD in Albany, New York
- WEKK-LD in Wausau, Wisconsin
- WIED-LD in Greenville, North Carolina
- WSBN-TV in Norton, Virginia
