= 47th Street =

47th Street may refer to:

- 47th Street (Manhattan), in New York City
- 47th Street (Washington, D.C.)
- 47th Street (album), a 1997 album by jazz trumpeter Malachi Thompson

== See also ==
- 47th Street station (disambiguation)
- West 47th Street
