= Oregon Caves Chateau =

- U.S. National Register of Historic Places
- U.S. National Historic Landmark
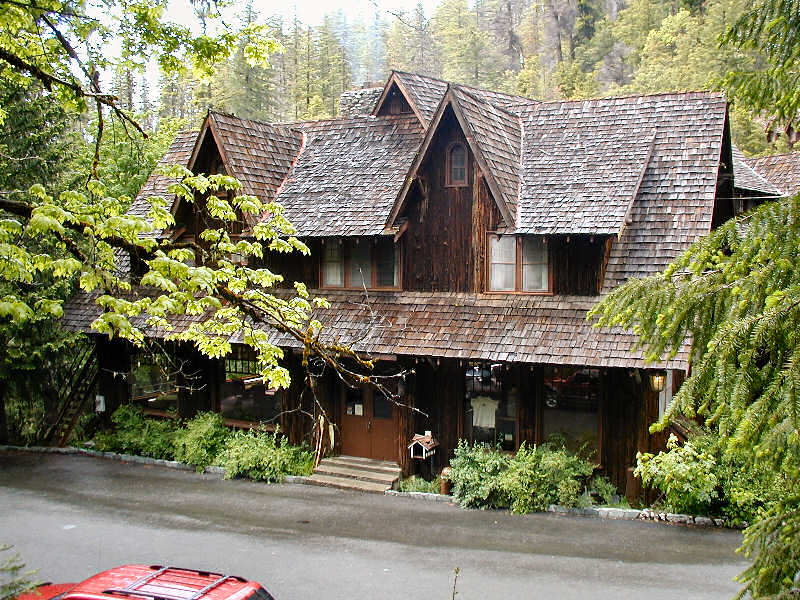
- The Chateau at Oregon Caves
- Location: Oregon Caves National Monument, Oregon
- Coordinates: 42°5′54.28″N 123°24′27.26″W
- Built: 1934
- Architect: Gust Lium
- NRHP reference No.: 87001346

Significant dates
- Added to NRHP: May 28, 1987
- Designated NHL: May 28, 1987

The Oregon Caves Chateau is a historic American hotel that opened in 1934. It is located in Oregon Caves National Monument in southern Oregon, near Cave Junction. The Chateau was designed and built by Gust Lium, a local contractor. Declared a National Historic Landmark in 1987, the Chateau building is architecturally significant because of its construction and design. The Chateau is closed for repairs until further notice.

The Chateau is six stories high and is built across a steep ravine. All floor levels except the top two have ground level entrances because of the steep slope. From the main front entrance the building appears to be only three stories high, but from the creek bed below the hotel, all six floors can be seen. The lowest two floors house storage and building systems. The third floor contains the dining room, coffee shop and kitchen. The fourth floor, at the level of the driveway, houses the lobby and some guest rooms, while the fifth and sixth floors have guest rooms and the manager's quarters.

== Exterior architecture ==
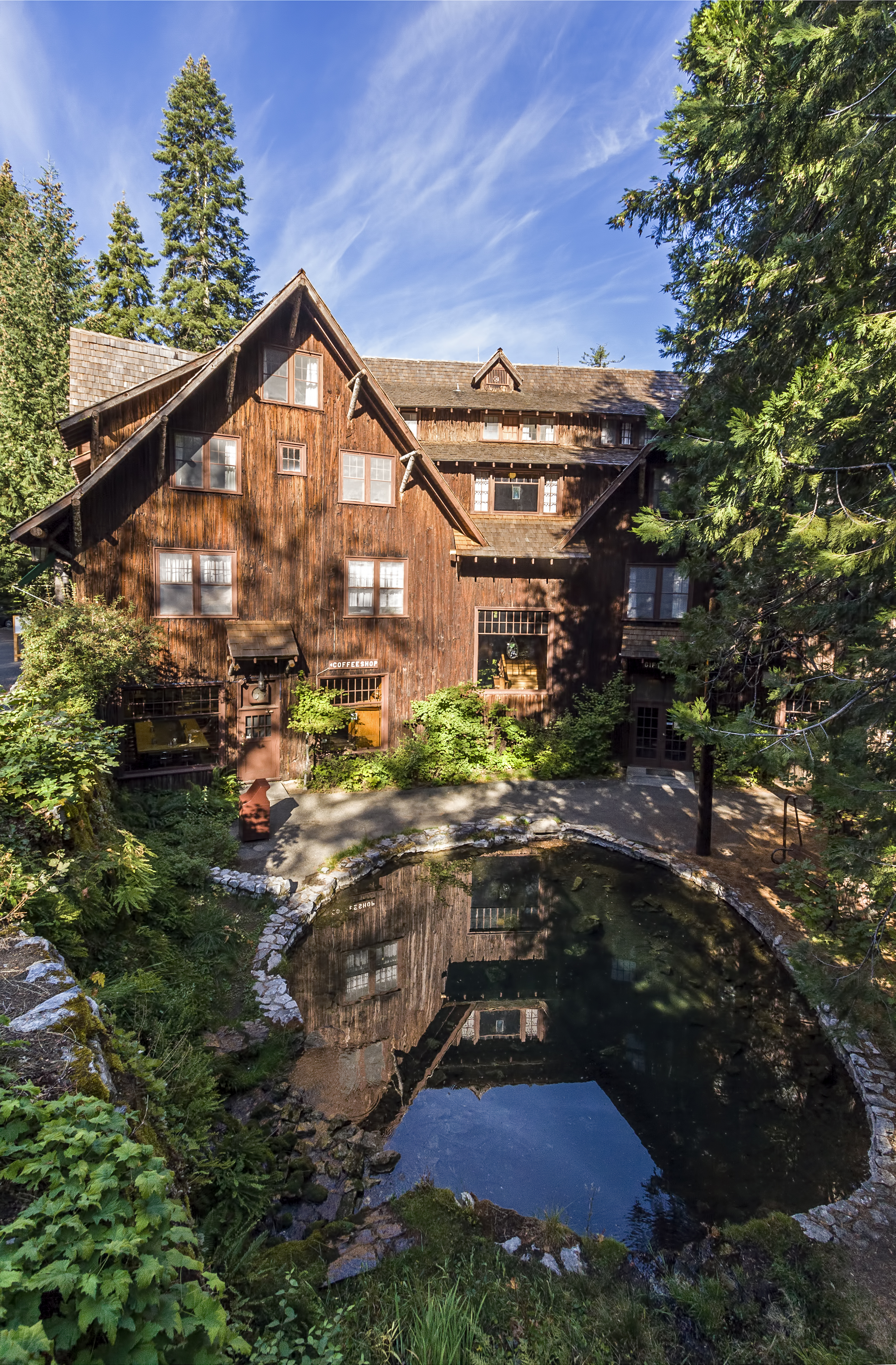
The Chateau from the entrance drive

The architecture of the Chateau building, as well as several other buildings nearby of the same age, is rustic. The building exterior is sheathed with redwood bark, giving it a shaggy appearance. Both shed and dormer style roofs mimic the surrounding mountains. Extensive rock work was constructed by the Civilian Conservation Corps under the direction of the Plans and Design branch of the Park Service, headed by Thomas Chalmers Vint, creating a bond between the building and the landscape. A small pond with a waterfall is in the courtyard.

== Interior architecture ==
Inside the Chateau the rustic architecture continues. Thirty-inch-diameter (760 mm) log posts support the open beam ceilings. A large, rustic-marble double-sided fireplace dominates the lobby. Dark paneled walls create a cavelike feel and allow one's attention to be drawn to the view outside the large picture windows. Since the lobby is four floors above the creek bed, the lobby windows look out into the trees of the surrounding forest. A grand staircase made of pine log stringers, maple steps, and balustrades of madrone, continue the rustic style. The gray wood in the lobby is tinted by cement, which came from the cement bags that the workers beat against the wood to loosen the contents.

The Chateau is in almost original condition. The rooms remain almost exactly as they were in 1934. There are no phones or televisions, and steam radiator heating remains. While formerly open spring to fall, the Chateau is closed until further notice, as it is undergoing a multi-year rehabilitation project that will "address a number of life, health, safety, and accessibility concerns while retaining the historic integrity of the building."

A 1930s-style coffee shop on the courtyard level of the Chateau is still in original condition, with original maple counters and chrome and vinyl swivel stools. Part of the flow from nearby Cave Creek is diverted into an artificial stream bed inside the building; the stream flows through the dining room.

== Monterey furniture ==
The Chateau contains a large collection of the original polychrome Mason Monterey furniture, made by the Mason Manufacturing Company in Los Angeles, California. The Mason Monterey line is important in that Frank and George Mason, its founders, were credited being originators of the Monterey trend. The Chateau has the largest public collection of Mason Monterey furniture in the world. In 2010, the first two dozen pieces were conserved and restored. Ten A-frame Dining chairs that went through the flood of 1964, having been stripped of most of their finish, were repaired and restored to their original appearance, while several upholstered pieces were conserved.

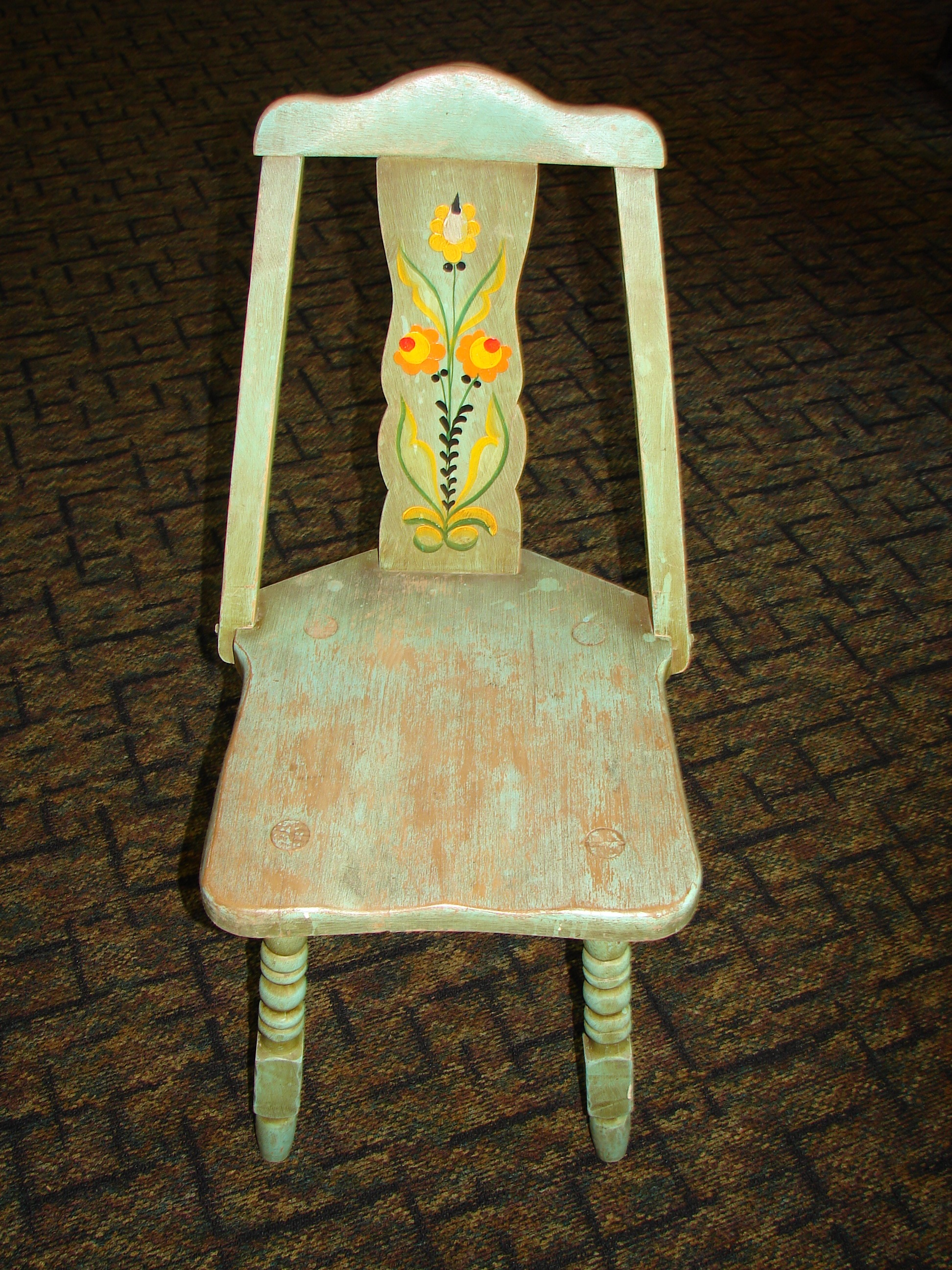
Mason Monterey A-frame Chair from the Oregon Caves NM, Chateau

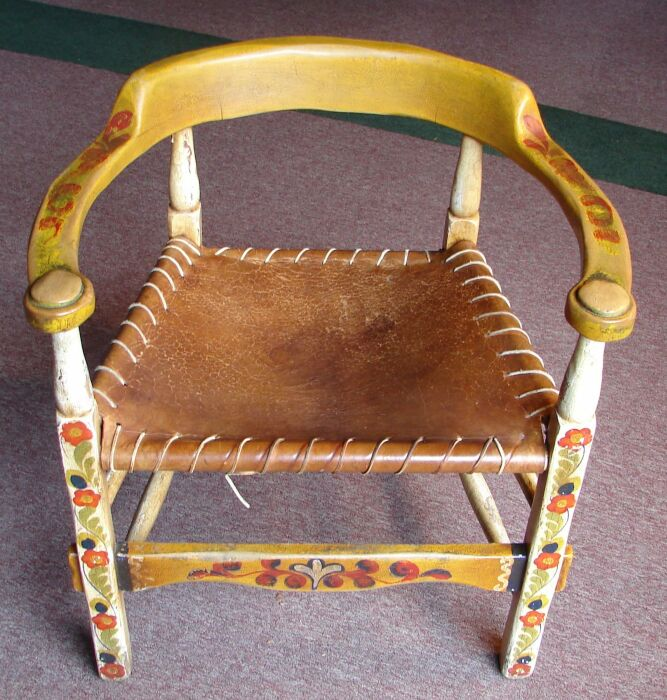
Straw Yellow and Straw Ivory Mason Monterey Horseshoe-back Polychrome Chair

== See also ==
- National Park Service Rustic
