= A47 =

A47 may refer to:

- Focke-Wulf A.47, a meteorological aircraft developed in Germany in 1931
- A47 road, a road connecting Birmingham and Lowestoft in England
- A47 road (Northern Ireland), a road connecting Kesh and Belleek
- A47 motorway (France), a road connecting Givors and Saint-Étienne
