= Oregon Route 46 =

State highway in Josephine County, Oregon, US

Oregon Route 46
- Route 46 highlighted in red

Route information
- Maintained by ODOT
- Length: 19.33 mi (31.11 km)
- Existed: 1932–present
- Component highways: Oregon Caves Highway No. 38

Major junctions
- West end: US 199 in Cave Junction
- East end: Oregon Caves National Monument and Preserve

Location
- Country: United States
- State: Oregon
- County: Josephine

Highway system
- Oregon Highways; Interstate; US; State; Named; Scenic
← OR 43	→ OR 47

Oregon Route 46, also known as Caves Highway, is an Oregon state highway that runs between the city of Cave Junction and the Oregon Caves National Monument and Preserve. OR 46 traverses the Oregon Caves Highway No. 38 of the Oregon state highway system.

The two-lane road is paved with asphalt along its entire length.

== Route description ==
OR 46 starts in Cave Junction, at an intersection with U.S. Route 199. It then heads east into the Siskiyou Mountains, terminating at a parking lot for the Oregon Caves National Monument and Preserve. A forest service road (Grayback Road, NF-4611) splits east from OR 46, eventually reaching the Rogue Valley and Oregon Route 238.

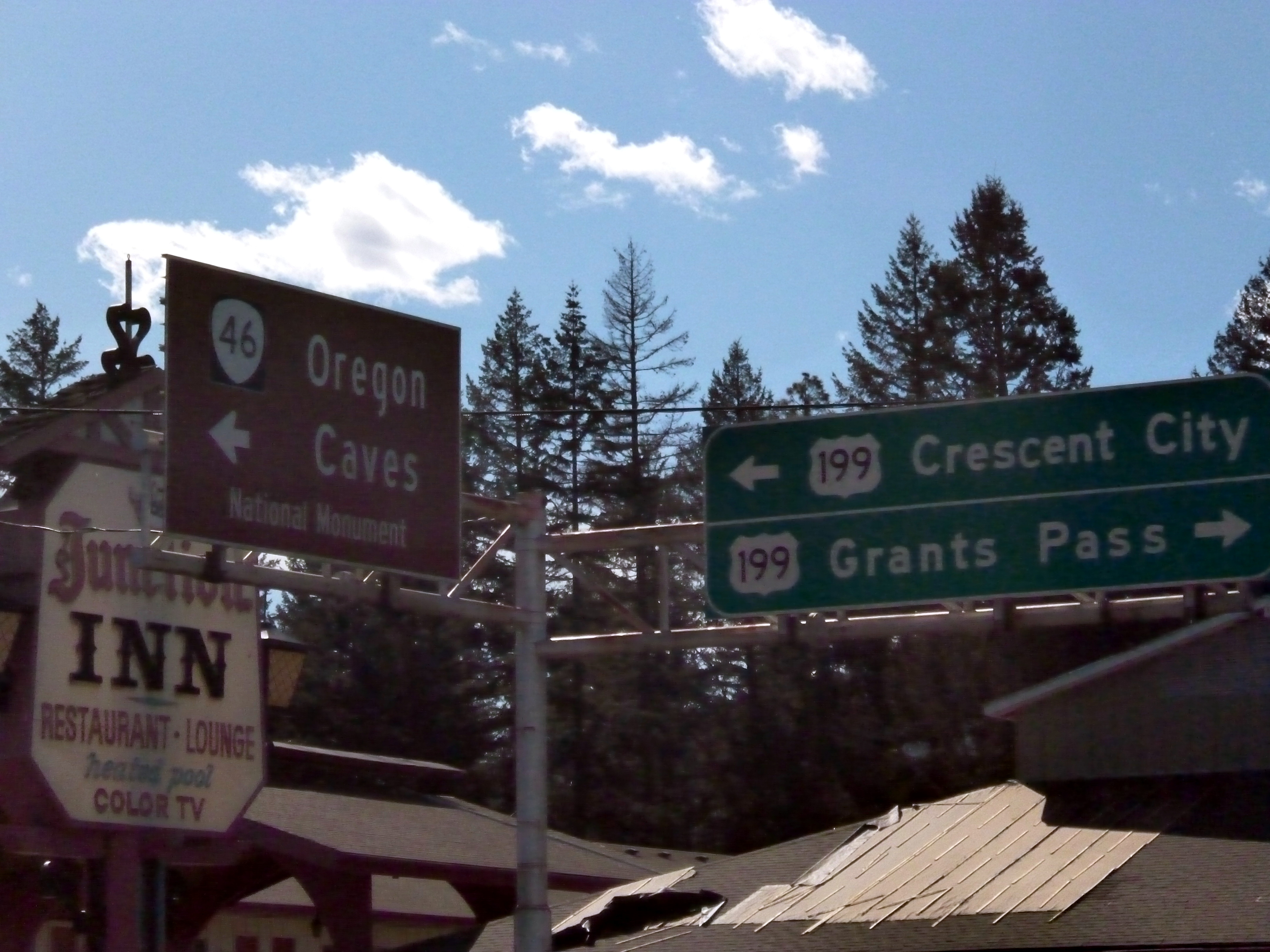
US 199 and Oregon Caves Highway Intersection

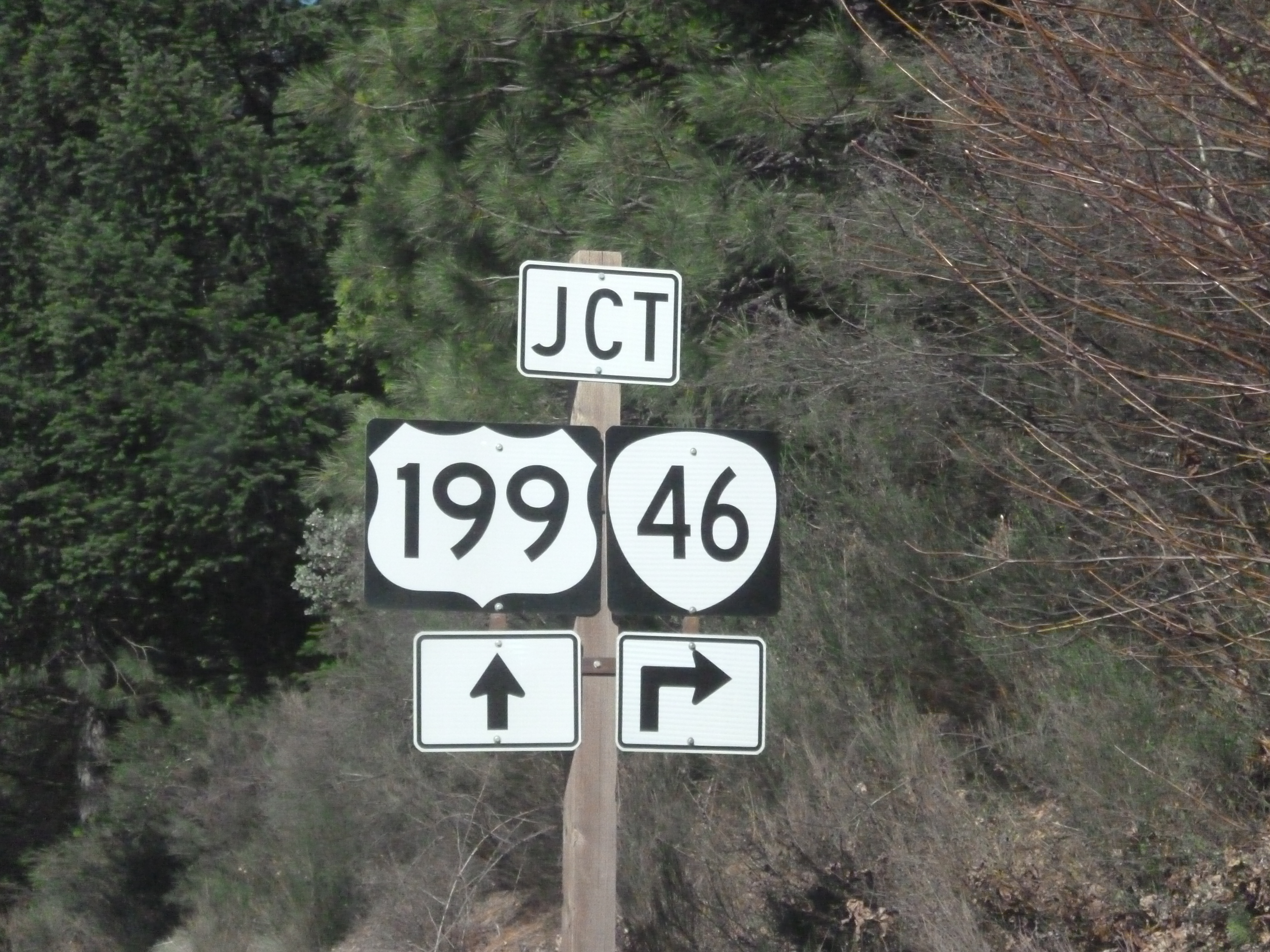
US 199 & Oregon 46 Sign

== Major intersections ==
The entire route is in Josephine County.

Location	mi	km	Destinations	Notes
Cave Junction	0.00	0.00	US 199 – Crescent City, Grants Pass	
	19.33	31.11	Oregon Caves National Monument and Preserve Main Parking Lot	
1.000 mi = 1.609 km; 1.000 km = 0.621 mi
