= A46 =

A46 may refer to:

- A46 road, a road in England
- Bundesautobahn 46, a motorway in North Rhine-Westphalia, Germany
- A46 autoroute, a motorway in France
- Aero A.46, a Czechoslovak military prototype biplane
