= 47th Division =

47th Division may refer to:

== Infantry divisions ==
- 47th Infantry Division (People's Republic of China)
- 47th Reserve Division, German Empire
- 47th Infantry Division (Wehrmacht), Germany
- 47th Volksgrenadier Division, Wehrmacht, Germany
- 47th Infantry Division "Bari", Kingdom of Italy
- 47th Division (Imperial Japanese Army)
- 47th Infantry Division (Russian Empire)
- 47th Motor Rifle Division, Soviet Union
- 47th Rifle Division, Soviet Union
- 47th (1/2nd London) Division, United Kingdom, World War I
- 47th (London) Infantry Division, United Kingdom, World War II
- 47th Infantry Division (United States)

== Cavalry divisions ==
- 47th Cavalry Division, Soviet Union

== Tank divisions ==
- 47th Tank Division (Russia)
- 47th Guards Tank Division, Soviet Union

== Aviation divisions ==
- 47th Air Division, United States

== See also ==
- List of military divisions by number
- 47th Brigade (disambiguation)
- 47th Regiment (disambiguation)
- 47th Battalion (disambiguation)
- 47th Squadron (disambiguation)
