= 47th Brigade =

47th Brigade may refer to:

== British India ==
- 47th Indian Infantry Brigade

== Ukraine ==
- 47th Artillery Brigade
- 47th Engineering Brigade
- 47th Mechanized Brigade, also known as Magura (Ukrainian: «Маґура»).

== United Kingdom ==
- 47th Brigade (United Kingdom)

== See also ==
- 47th Division (disambiguation)
- 47th Regiment (disambiguation)
