= 47th Regiment =

47th regiment may refer to:

- 47th (Lancashire) Regiment of Foot, a British Army infantry regiment
- 47th Regiment Royal Artillery, a British Army artillery regiment
- 47th (Oldham) Royal Tank Regiment, a British Army armoured regiment
- 47th Sikhs, a British Indian Army regiment
- 47th Palma Light Infantry Regiment, a Spanish Army infantry regiment
- 47th Infantry Regiment (United States), a US Army regiment
- 47th Infantry Regiment (Imperial Japanese Army), a Japanese regiment

American Civil War

- 47th Illinois Volunteer Infantry Regiment
- 47th Wisconsin Volunteer Infantry Regiment
- 47th Iowa Volunteer Infantry Regiment
- 47th Indiana Infantry Regiment
- 47th United States Colored Infantry Regiment
- 47th Missouri Volunteer Infantry
- 47th Regiment Kentucky Volunteer Mounted Infantry
- 47th Pennsylvania Infantry Regiment
- 47th New York Volunteer Infantry
- 47th Tennessee Infantry Regiment
- 47th Arkansas Infantry (Mounted)
- 47th Virginia Infantry
- 47th Georgia Volunteer Infantry
