= Takilma, Oregon =

Unincorporated community in the state of Oregon, United States

- Census-designated place
- Location within Oregon Location within the United States
- Coordinates: 42°3′6″N 123°37′6″W
- Country: United States
- State: Oregon
- County: Josephine

Area
  - Total: 5.94 sq mi (15.39 km^{2})
  - Land: 5.94 sq mi (15.39 km^{2})
  - Water: 0 sq mi (0.00 km^{2})
- Elevation: 1,576 ft (480 m)

Population (2020)
  - Total: 423
  - Density: 71.2/sq mi (27.48/km^{2})
- Time zone: UTC−08:00 (Pacific (PST))
  - Summer (DST): UTC−07:00 (PDT)
- ZIP Code: 97523
- Area codes: 458 and 541
- FIPS code: 41-72400
- GNIS feature ID: 1150841

Takilma is an unincorporated community and census-designated place (CDP) in Josephine County, Oregon, United States, 10 miles (16 km) south of Cave Junction. It is located on the East Fork Illinois River, about a mile southeast of the ghost town of Waldo. As of the 2020 census, Takilma had a population of 423.

Takilma is considered an alternative community and an informal artist colony, which is home to several artists, such as Kendall Art Glass. It may be best known as the site of a tree house resort operated by Out'n'About.

== Demographics ==
Historical population
Census	Pop.	Note	%±
2020	423		—
U.S. Decennial Census

== History ==
According to Oregon Geographic Names, Takilma was originally called "Taklamah", probably by Col. T. W. Draper of the Waldo Copper Company for an Indian chief. The name was changed to "Takilma" in 1902, after the Takelma tribe, who lived on the Rogue River. The Takilma post office operated from 1902 until 1967. After that time the building became a general store, but was burned to the ground in 1988 after a man was murdered by the store's owner.

=== Counterculture ===
In the winter of 1968, hippies began moving into the Illinois Valley as part of the back to the land movement, notably into Takilma. Signs stating "We do not solicit hippy patronage" soon appeared in the windows of Cave Junction businesses. Despite this, the hippies stayed and became a force in the community. They founded the Takilma People's Clinic and later the Siskiyou Community Health Center, the Dome School, the Illinois Valley Fire District's Takilma station, the Siskiyou Regional Education Project and the Jefferson Baroque Orchestra.

The Takilma People's Clinic was started in 1973, bringing the first new doctor to the Illinois Valley in years. The 1987 Longwood fire forced the clinic, now called the Siskiyou Community Health Center, to move into Cave Junction. It has since spawned sister clinics in Grants Pass and Roseburg. The Dome School opened in 1975 as an alternative to public education. It educates about 60 preschool through high school children each year, and runs a federally funded summer program for at risk children. The Illinois Valley Fire District's Takilma station was organized in the late 1970s and worked the firelines during the 1987 Longwood fire. The Jefferson Baroque Orchestra was formed in 1994 by Takilma resident Jim Rich, and is now in its 20th season, with performances in Grants Pass and Ashland.

Many of the hippies were activists from California universities. They created Takilma's environmental organization, the Siskiyou Regional Education Project, in 1982. A 1996 proposal for a prison near Cave Junction and Takilma brought the two communities together, but environmental issues still create a divide between them.

== See also ==
- Jefferson (proposed Pacific state)
