= Out'n'About =

Coordinates: 42.036736°N 123.623818°W

Out 'N' About Treehouse Treesort
- Type: Private
- Founded: 1990
- Founder: Michael Garnier
- Headquarters: Cave Junction, Oregon United States
- Website: www.treehouses.com

Out 'N' About is a southern Oregon company that operates treehouse bed and breakfasts and assists with the construction of treehouses. It is located out and about 10 miles (16 km) Southeast of Cave Junction, Oregon,

== Treehouse Treesort ==
Out 'N' About Treehouse Treesort is located in the unincorporated community of Takilma, Oregon, that hosts a multi-treehouse bed and breakfast run by Michael Garnier. Garnier limbs, developed by Michael Garnier and used to support all of Out 'N' About's tree houses, are one-and-a-half-inch-thick bolts surrounded by a cuff, both made of Grade 5 steel, and able to support 8,000 lb (3,600 kg).

The treesort has nine treehouses, three with bathrooms. The treehouses range from 8 to 37 feet (11 m) off the ground, and include skylights, stained-glass windows, and hardwood floors.

The Swiss Family complex has parent and child treehouses, connected by swinging bridge. The Cavaltree Fort is two stories tall, with a living unit below, and an observation deck above. The Peacock Perch has only 100 square feet (9.3 m^{2}), and visitors must use a chamber pot or descend 26 feet to use the communal bathroom.

== Legal battle ==
Garnier had to fight the government for almost 10 years before gaining the right to house guests in his nine treehouses. Josephine County building inspectors didn't believe that it was structurally sound, so Garnier gathered 66 people, two dogs and a cat (collectively weighing 10,847 pounds) in a single treehouse. Despite this, the county demanded that he tear the treehouses down. He ignored them, and when they objected to him charging money to stay in the treehouses, Garnier then allowed visitors to stay for free, with the requirement that they buy a $75 T-shirt first. The resulting legal battle lasted ten years, with Garnier attaching a steel cable zip line to his bedroom window in case of the need for a midnight escape. In 2001, the county relented and granted Garnier his building permits.
