= Chêne chapelle =

Oak tree in Seine-Maritime, in France

Coordinates: 49°35′47″N 0°40′35″E

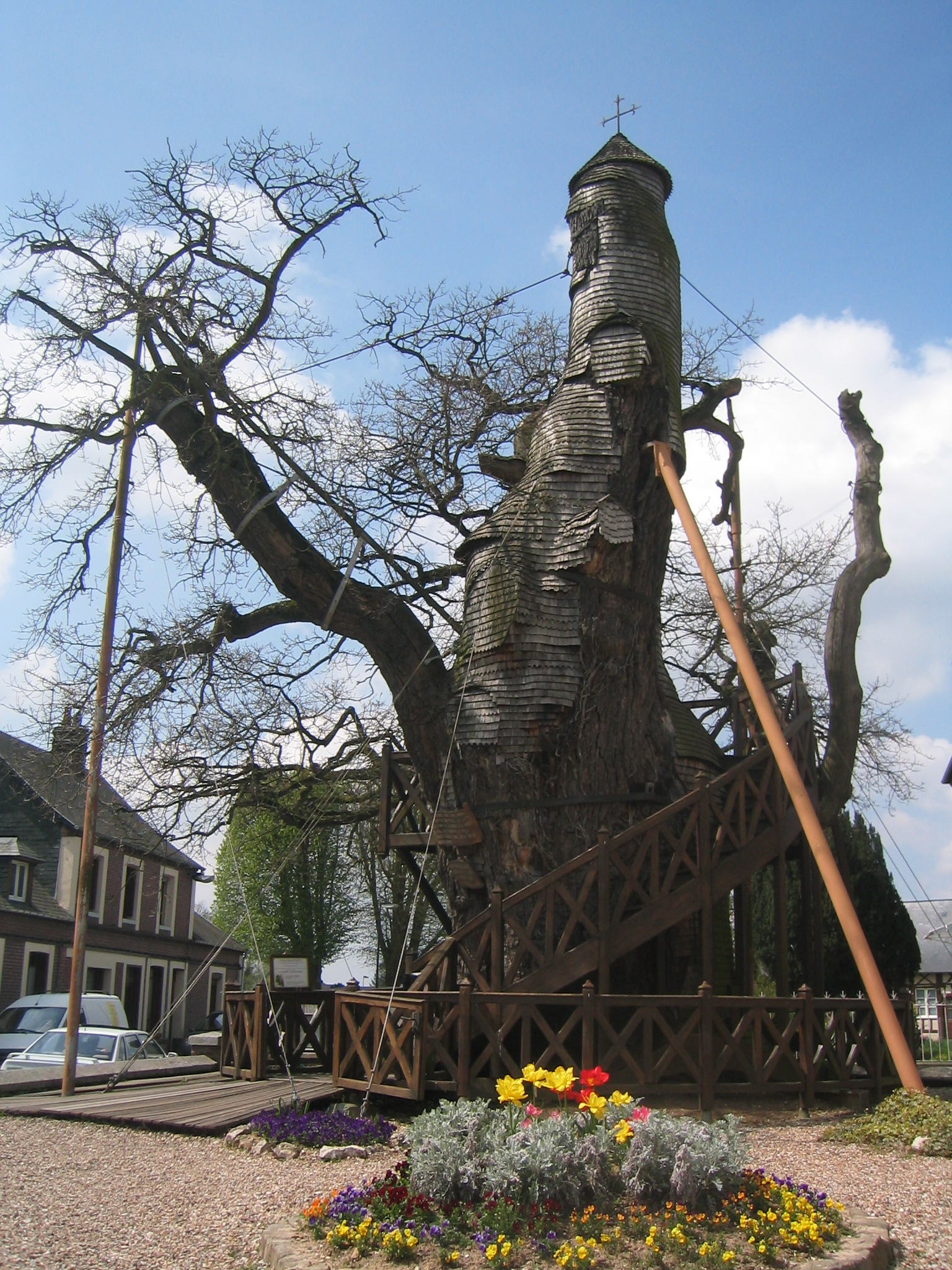
Chêne chapelle in Allouville-Bellefosse

The Chêne chapelle (lit. "chapel oak") is an oak tree located in Allouville-Bellefosse in Seine-Maritime, Normandy, France.

== Description ==
The oak tree is between 800 and 1,200 years old. It is 15 metres (49 ft) high and its base has a circumference of 16 metres (52 ft). Its hollow trunk is used as the walls of the two chapels, which were built there in 1696 and are still used: Notre-Dame-de-la-Paix ("Our Lady of Peace") and the Chambre de l'Ermite ("Hermit's room"). A spiral staircase around the trunk provides access to the chapels.

When the tree was nearing 500 years of age, it was struck by lightning; the resulting fire burned slowly through the center and hollowed the tree out. The local Abbot Du Detroit and the village priest, Father Du Cerceau, claimed that the lightning striking and hollowing the tree was an event that had happened with holy purpose. So they built a place of pilgrimage devoted to the Virgin Mary in the hollow. In later years, the chapel above was added, as was the staircase.

During the French Revolution, the tree became an emblem of the old system of governance and tyranny as well as the church that aided and abetted it: a crowd descended upon the village, intent on burning the tree to the ground. However, a local whose name is lost renamed the oak the "Temple of Reason" and as such it became a symbol of the new ways of thinking and was spared.

Today, a number of measures are necessary in order to counter problems caused by the age of the tree: poles shore up the weight of some branches, and wooden shingles have been used to cover areas of the tree that have lost their bark; still, part of its trunk is already dead.

Twice a year, mass is celebrated in the oak. The oak is the site of a pilgrimage on August 15 (Assumption of Mary).

== Protection ==
The Notre-Dame-de-la-Paix chapel has been classified since 1932 as a monument historique by the French Ministry of Culture.

== Gallery ==
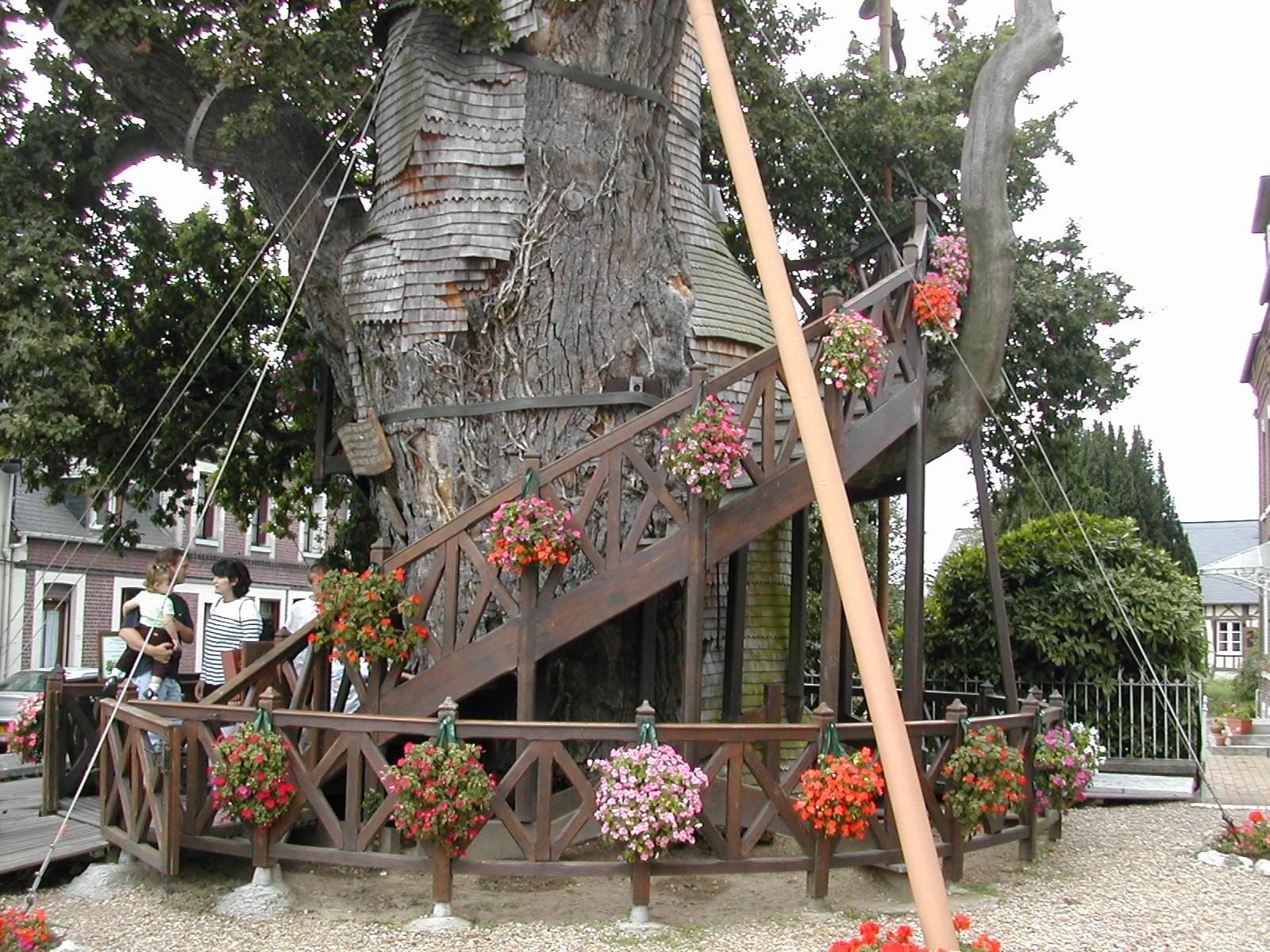

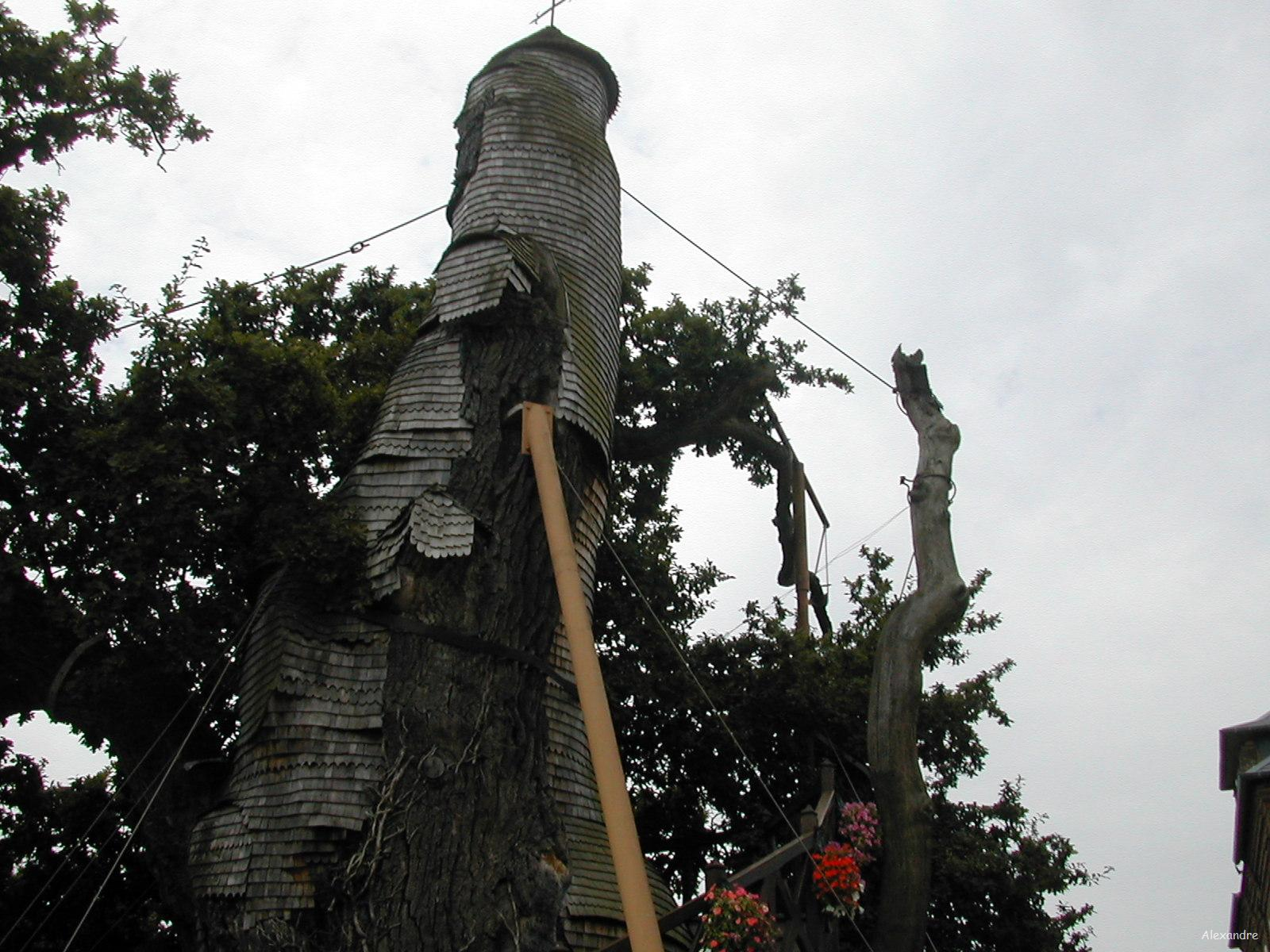

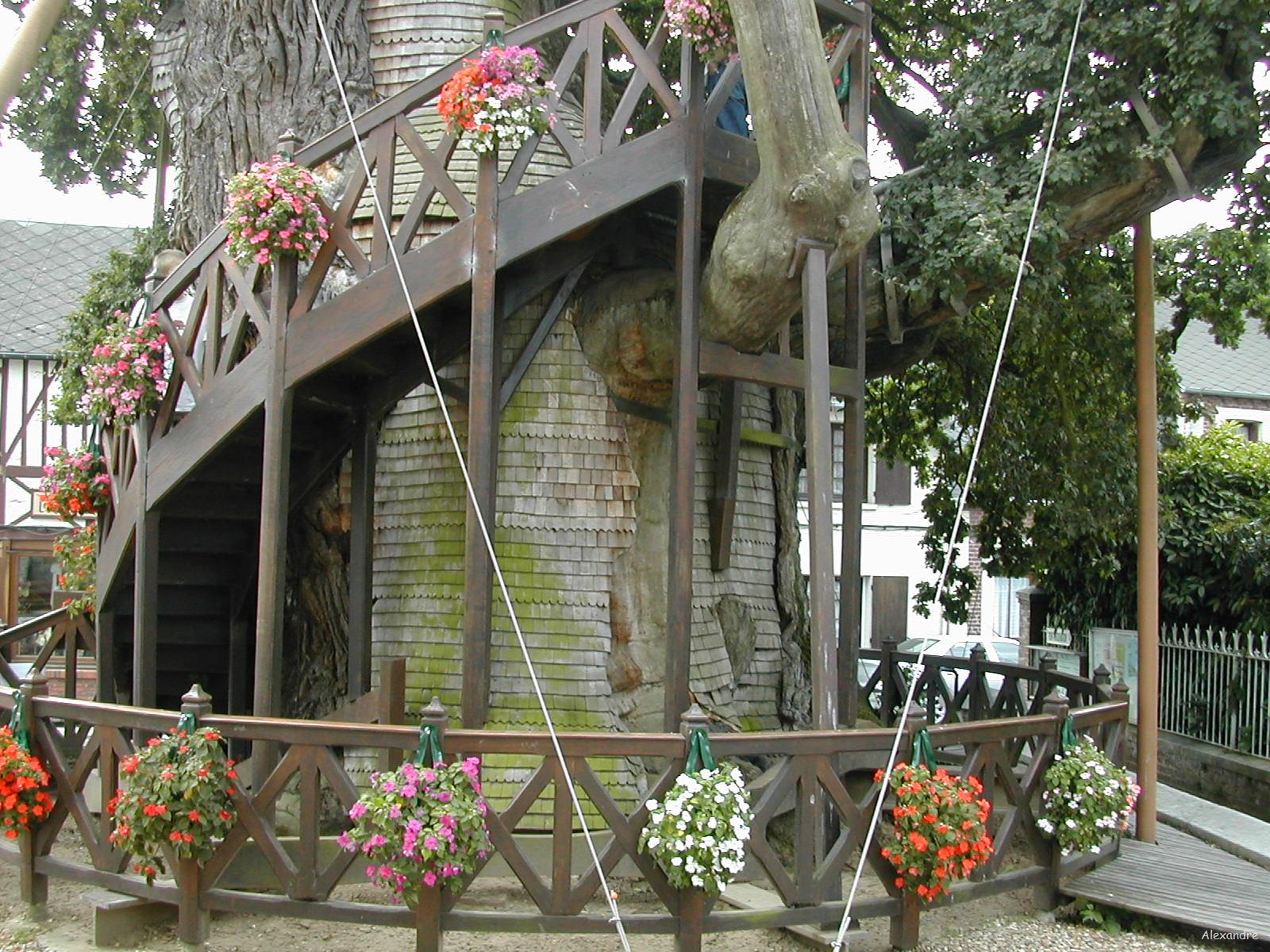

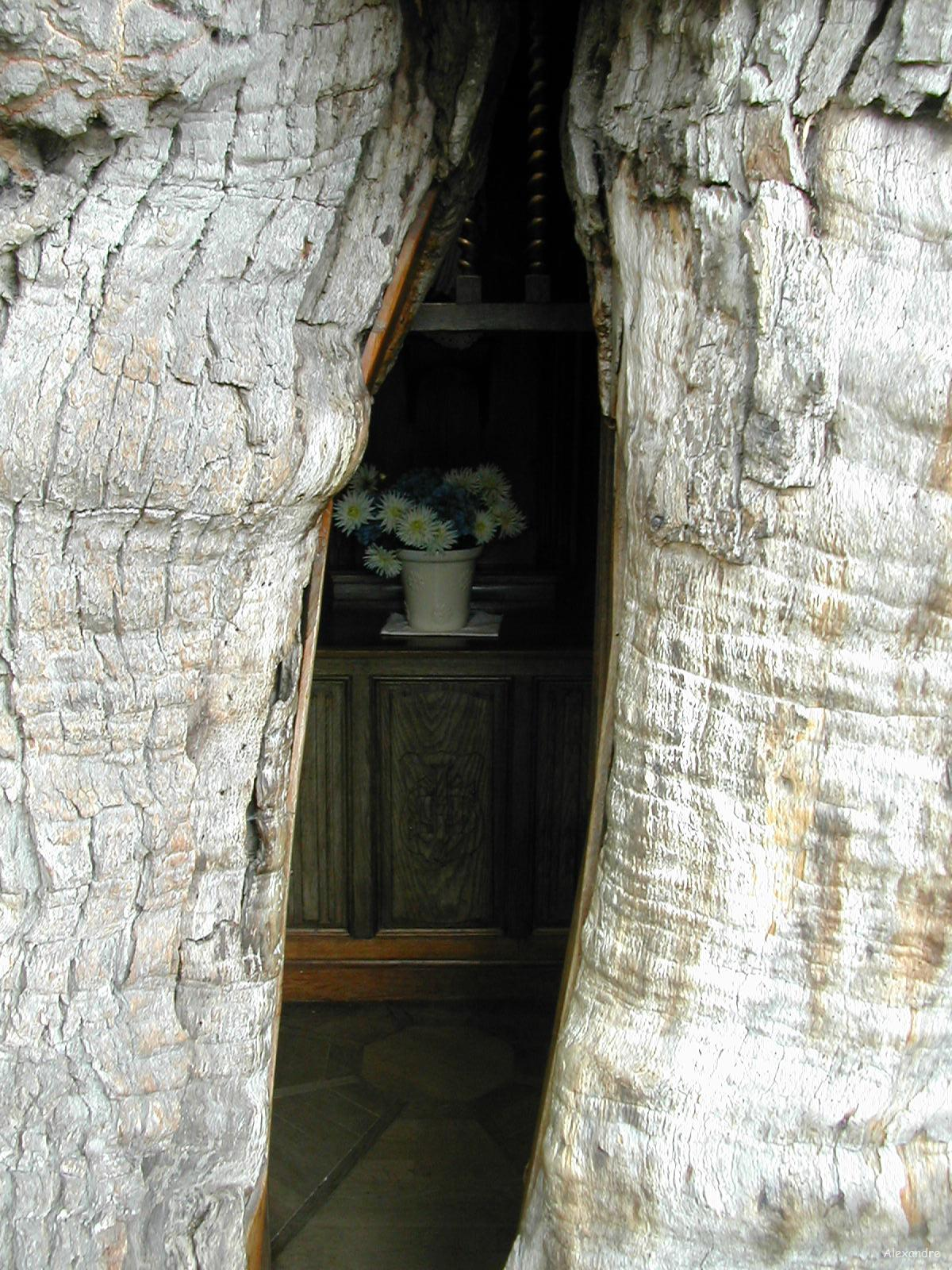

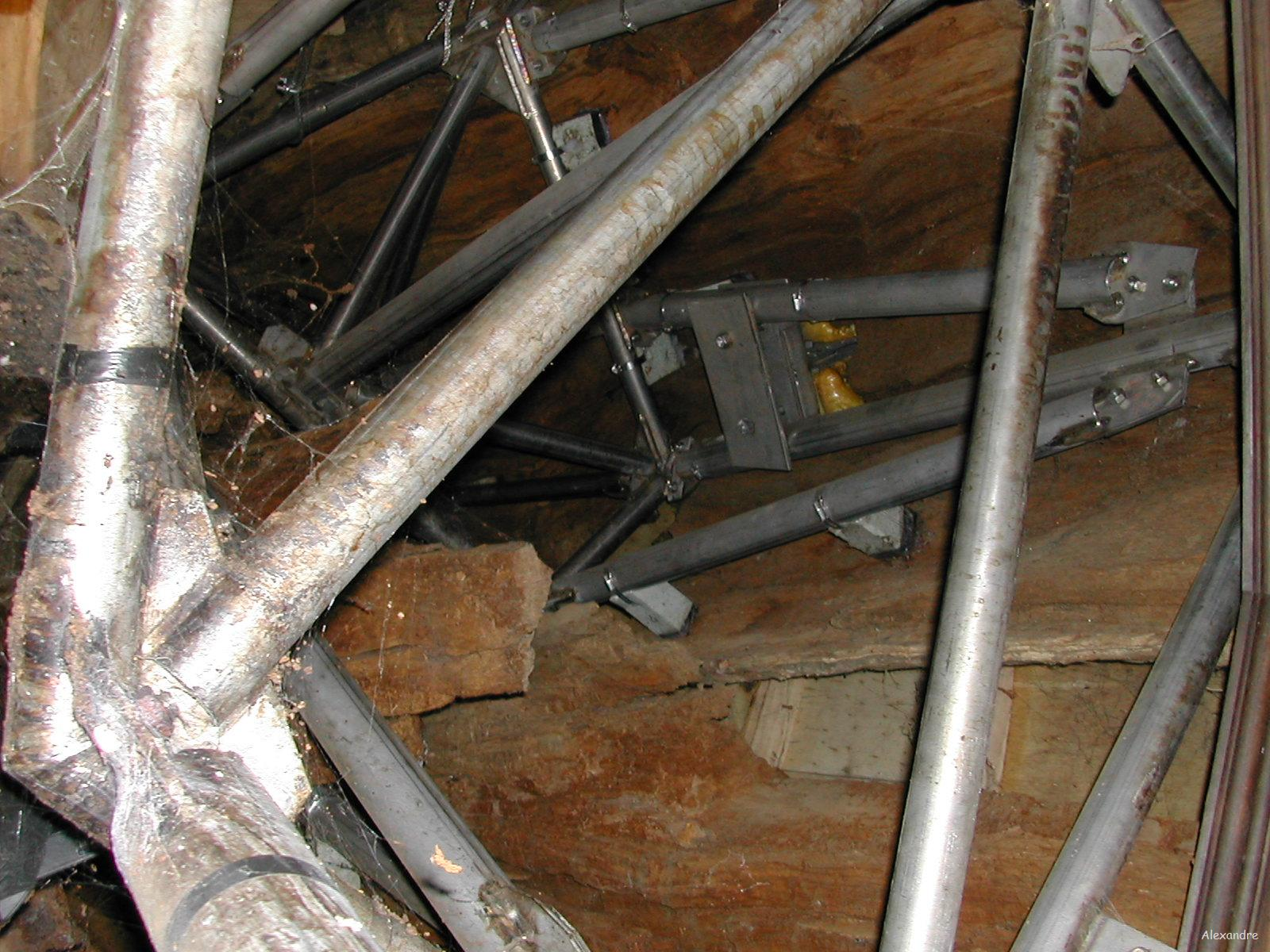

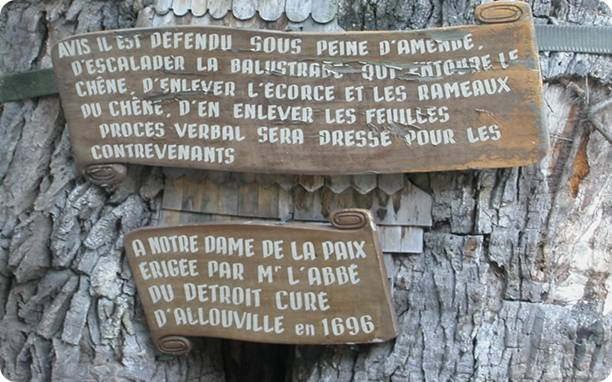

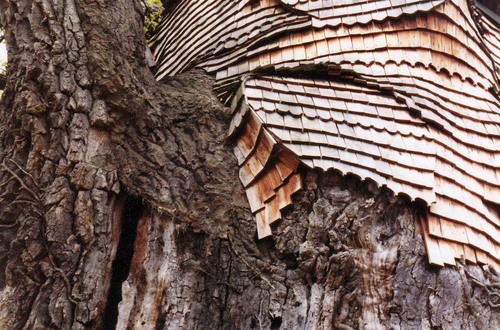

== Other chapel oaks ==
Other chapel oaks exist in France:

- in Saint-Sulpice-le-Verdon, Vendée
- in Villedieu-la-Blouère, Maine-et-Loire

== See also ==
- Tree house
- List of individual trees
