= Tree house =

Above-ground platform or building in a tree

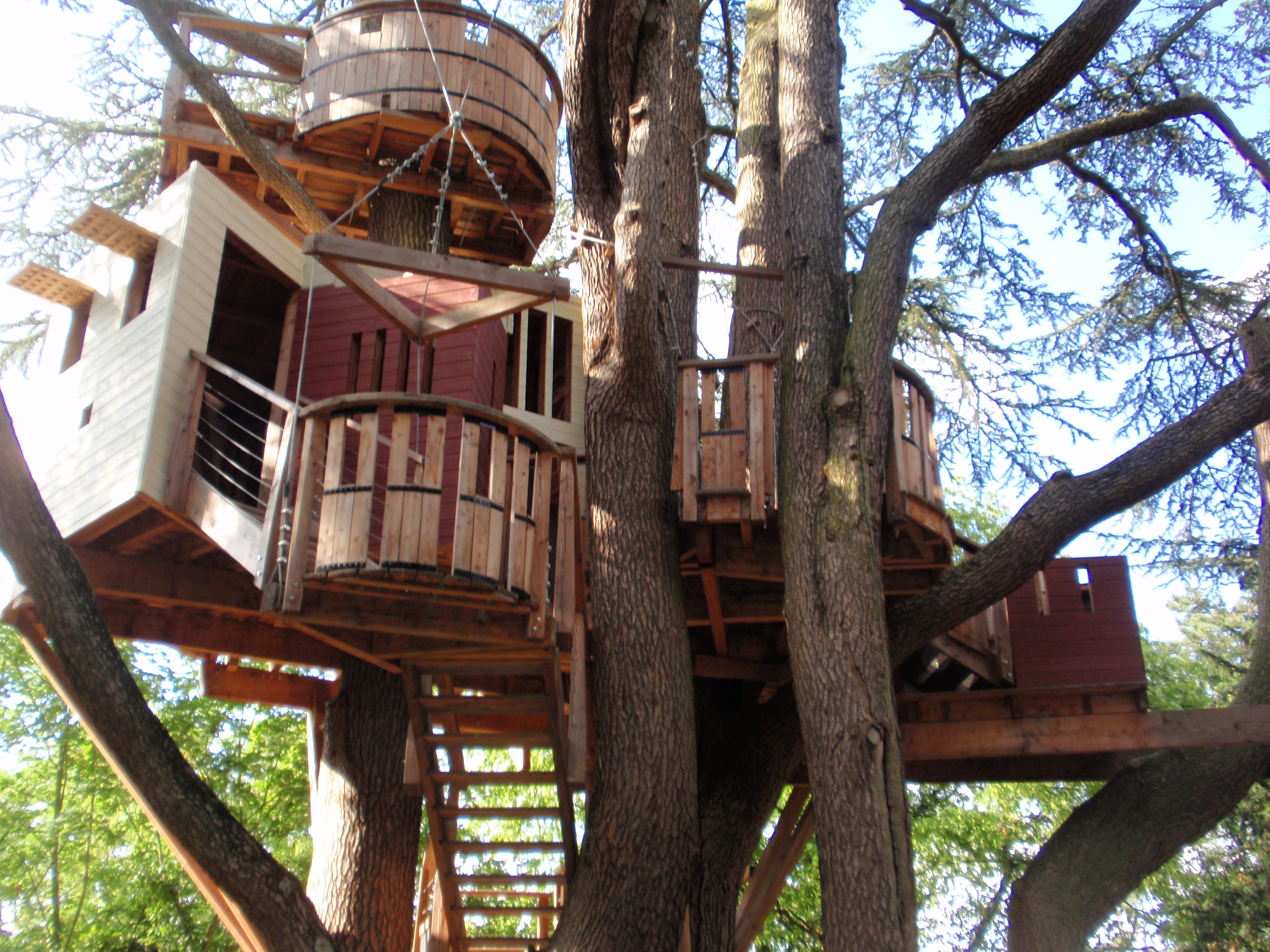
A tree house in the park of the Château de Langeais in the Loire Valley, France

A tree house, tree fort or tree shed, is a platform or building constructed around, next to or among the trunk or branches of one or more mature trees while above ground level. Tree houses can be used for recreation, work space, habitation, a hangout space and observation. People occasionally connect ladders or staircases to get up to the platforms.

== History ==
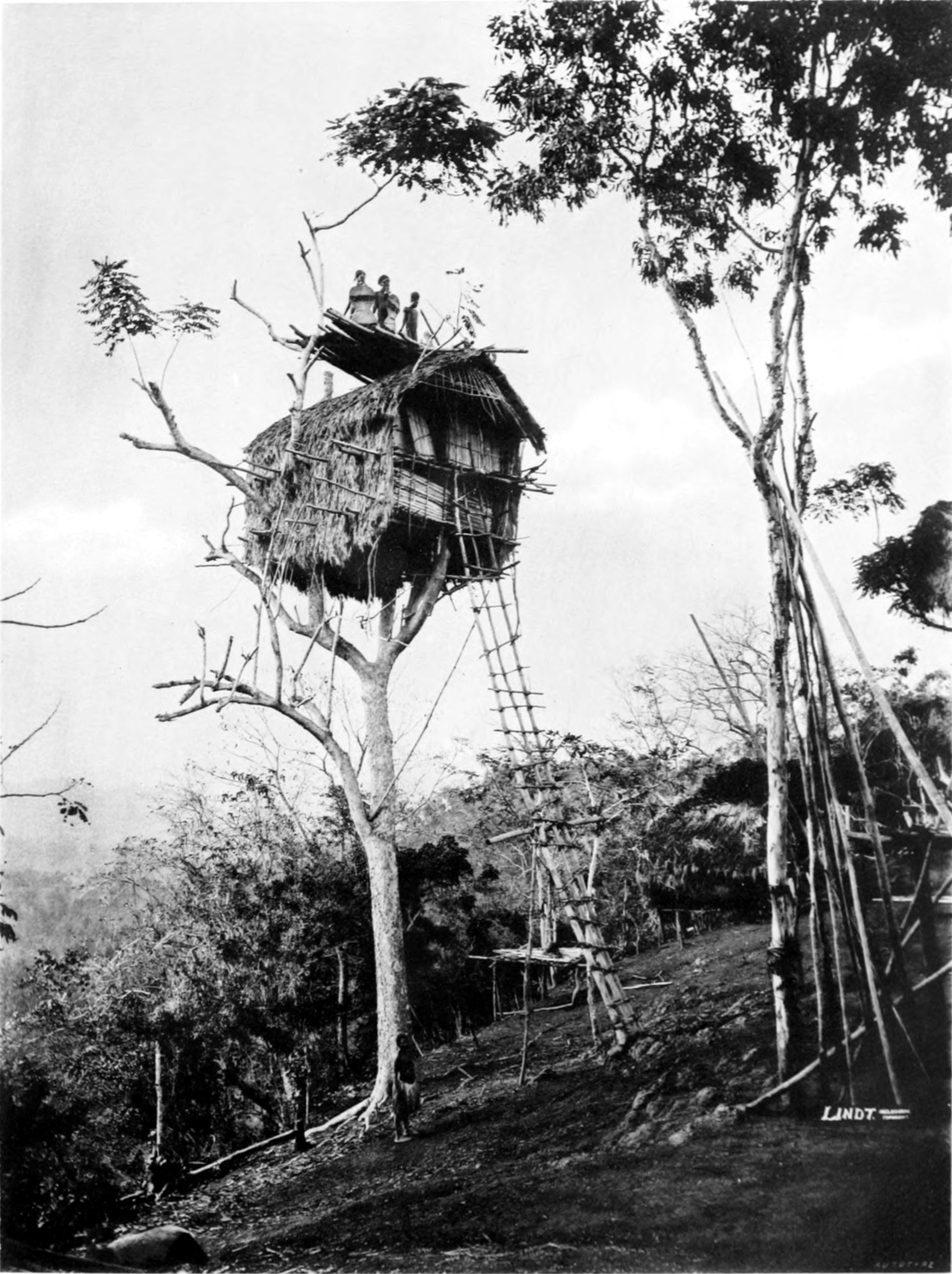
Papuan tree house in British New Guinea, 1885

=== Prehistoric hypotheses ===
All great apes build tree platforms or nests as shelter from dangers on the ground, and the habit may have been inherited by humans. While no evidence of prehistoric human-made tree houses has been found, wooden structures would not have survived over time. In contrast, evidence of cave dwellings, rock shelters, and bonfires is detectable, but is notably scarce from before 40,000 years ago. This has led to the speculative hypothesis that archaic humans may have lived in trees until then. The skeletal changes due to the evolution of human bipedalism started at least four million years ago, but early bipedal hominins may still have spent some time in trees and retained some tree-climbing abilities. Early terrestrial bipedalism is supported by evidence such as fossilized bones and footprints (like the Laetoli footprints). According to the savannah hypothesis, this evolution happened as an effect of early humans adapting to life on the ground in savannah environments, partly for more energy-efficient locomotion.

=== In indigenous societies ===
Even today, tree houses are built by some indigenous people in order to escape the danger and adversity on the ground in some parts of the tropics. It has been claimed that the majority of the Korowai clans, a Papuan tribe in the southeast of Irian Jaya, live in tree houses on their isolated territory as protection against a tribe of neighbouring head-hunters, the Citak. The BBC revealed in 2018 that the Korowai had constructed some very high tree houses "for the benefit of overseas programme makers" and did not actually live in them. However, the Korowai people still build tree houses, not elevated but fastened to the trunks of tall trees, to protect occupants and store food away from scavenging animals.

=== In western societies ===
Trees have historically been integrated into the construction of buildings, for example the walls of a chapel, to provide support to a structure built around them. Chêne chapelle is an example of this practice. Modern tree houses are usually built as play areas for children or for leisure purposes, but may also be used as accommodation in hotels or residential applications. In this case, the main part of the structure is built with more typical construction materials. The use of tree houses in this manner is part of a movement towards the practice of "living architecture".

Tree houses may be considered as an option for building eco-friendly houses in forested areas, because unlike more typical forms of housing, they do not require the clearing of trees.

== Support methods and technology ==
There are numerous techniques to fasten the structure to the tree which seek to minimize tree damage.

The construction of modern tree houses usually starts with the creation of a rigid platform, on which the house will be placed; the platform will lean (possibly on the corners) on the branches. In case there are not enough suitable supports, the methods to support the platform are:

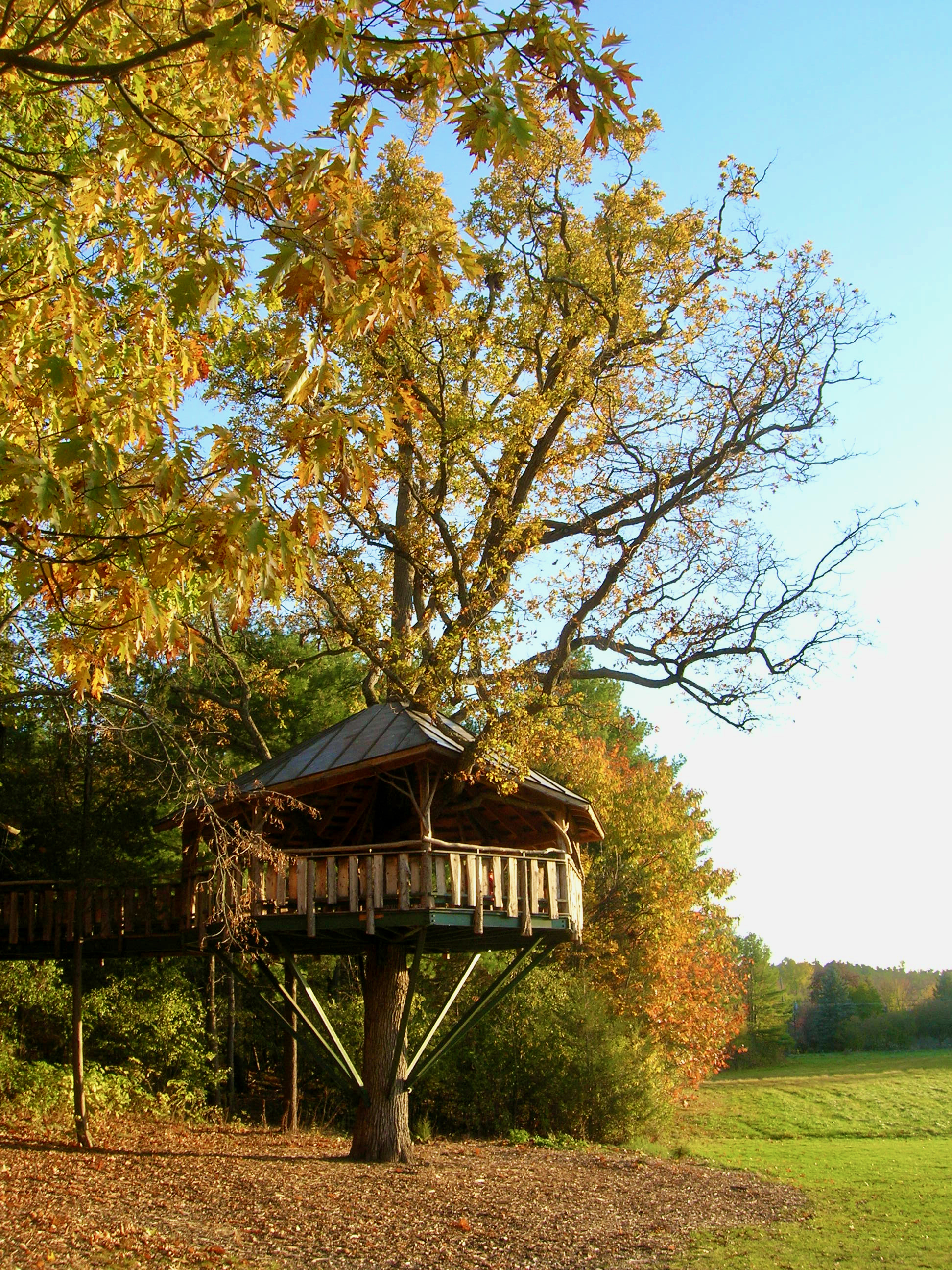
Strutted treehouse utilizing tree attachment bolts in a public park in Burlington, Vermont

=== Struts and stilts ===
Struts and stilts are used for relieving weights on a lower elevation or straight to the ground; tree houses supported by stilts weigh much less on the tree and help to prevent stress, potential strain, and injury caused by puncture holes. Stilts are typically anchored into the ground with concrete, although new designs such as the "Diamond Pier" speeds installation and are less invasive for the root system. Stilts are considered the easiest method of supporting larger tree houses and can also increase structural support and safety.

=== Stay rods ===
Stay rods are used for relieving weights on a higher elevation. These systems are particularly useful to control movements caused by wind or tree growth. However, they are used less often due to the natural limits of the system. Higher elevation and more branches tailing off decreases capacity and increases wind sensitivity. Building materials for hanging include ropes, wire cables, tension fasteners, and springs.

=== Friction and tension fasteners ===
Friction and tension fasteners are the most common noninvasive methods of securing tree houses. They do not use nails, screws or bolts, but instead grip the beams to the trunk by means of counter-beam, threaded bars, or tying.

=== Invasive methods ===
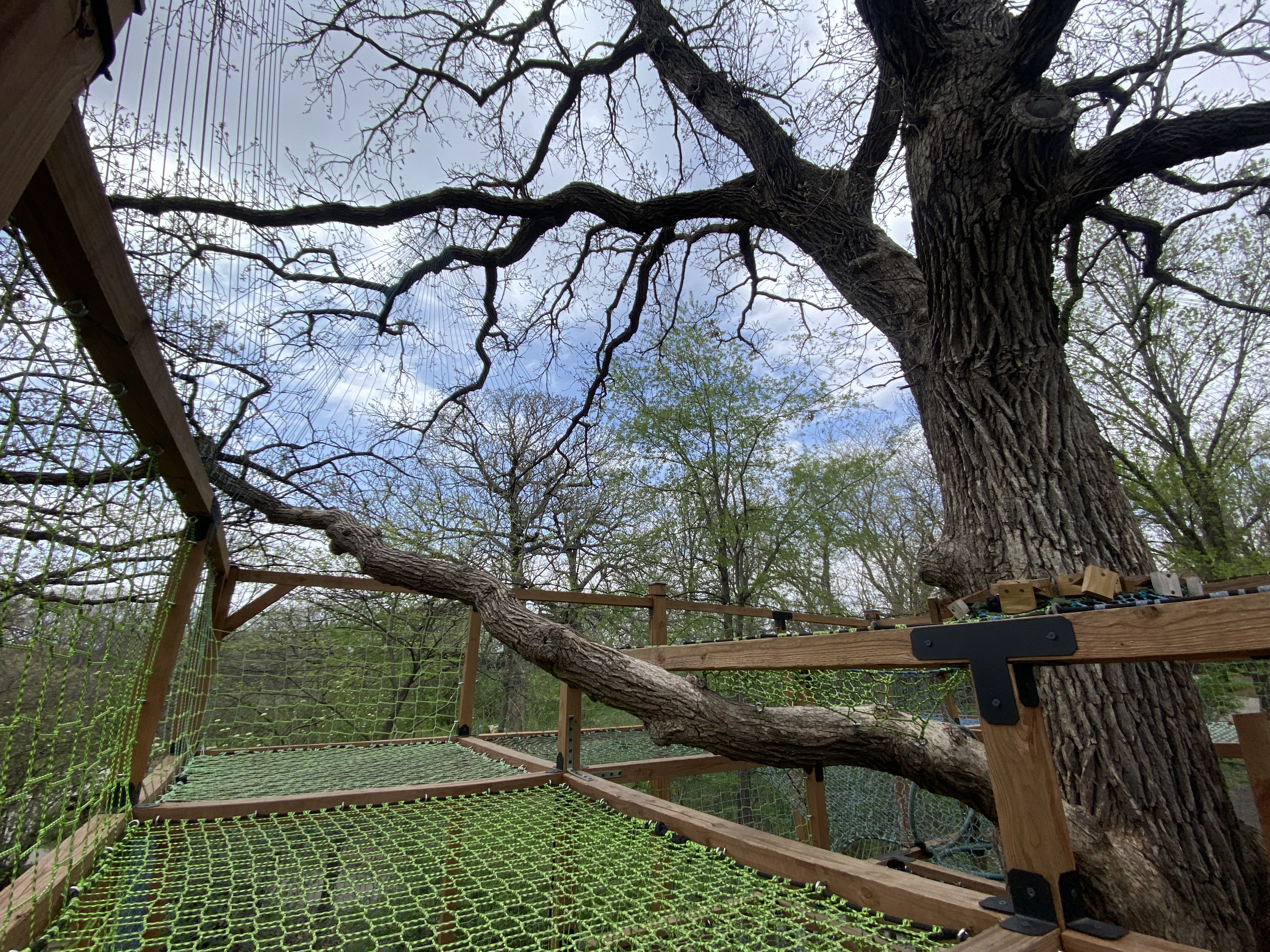
A tree platform in Nebraska City that puts eye screws in a branch to secure the netting

Invasive methods are all methods that use nails, screws, bolts, kingpins, etc. Because these methods require punctures in the tree, they must be planned properly in order to minimize stress. Not all species of plants suffer from puncture in the same way, depending partly on whether the sap conduits run in the pith or in the bark. Nails are generally not recommended. A special kind of bolt developed in the 1990s called a treehouse attachment bolt can support greater weights than earlier methods.

== Popularity ==
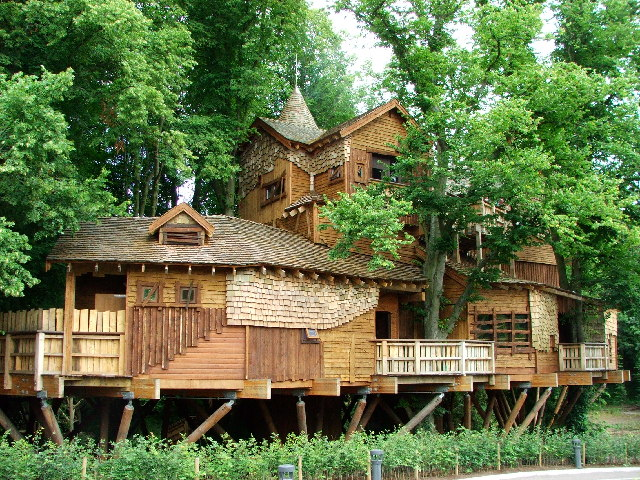
Treehouse at Alnwick Gardens in the United Kingdom, with walkways through the tree canopy

Since the mid-1990s, recreational tree houses have enjoyed a rise in popularity in countries such as the United States and parts of Europe. This has been due to increased disposable income, better technology for builders, research into safe building practices and an increased interest in environmental issues, particularly sustainable living. This growing popularity is also reflected in a rise of social media channels, websites, and television shows specially dedicated to featuring tree houses around the world.

Increased popularity has, in turn, given rise to demand for businesses covering all building and design work for clients. There are over 30 businesses in Europe and the US specializing in the construction of tree houses of various degrees of permanence and sophistication, from children's play structures to fully functioning homes.

Popularity of tree house hotels is equally growing due to the popularity in the glamping and unique accommodation industries with a number of booking websites offering accommodation in tree houses.

== Building regulations ==
Many areas of the world have no specific planning laws for tree houses, so the legal issues can be confusing to both the builder and the local planning departments. Treehouses can be exempt, partially regulated or fully regulated – depending on the locale.

In some cases, tree houses are exempted from standard building regulations, as they are considered outside of the regulations specification. An exemption may be given to a builder if the tree house is in a remote or non-urban location. Alternatively, a tree house may be included in the same category as structures such as garden sheds, sometimes called a "temporary structure". There may be restrictions on height, distance from boundary and privacy for nearby properties. There are various grey areas in these laws, as they were not specifically designed for tree-borne structures. A very small number of planning departments have specific regulations for tree houses, which set out clearly what may be built and where. For safety during the tree house construction, it is usually best to do as much work as possible on the ground, taking long-term viability into consideration.

== Protest communities ==
The tree house has been central to various environmental protest communities around the world, in a technique, popularized, known as tree sitting. This method may be used in protests against proposed road building or old-growth forestry operations. Tree houses are used as a method of defence from which it is difficult and costly to safely evict the protesters and begin work. Julia Butterfly Hill is a particularly well known tree sitter who occupied a Californian redwood for 738 days (from December 1997 to December 1999), saving the tree and others in the immediate area. Her accommodation consisted of two 3 square metres (32 sq ft) platforms 60 metres (200 ft) above the ground.

== Gallery ==
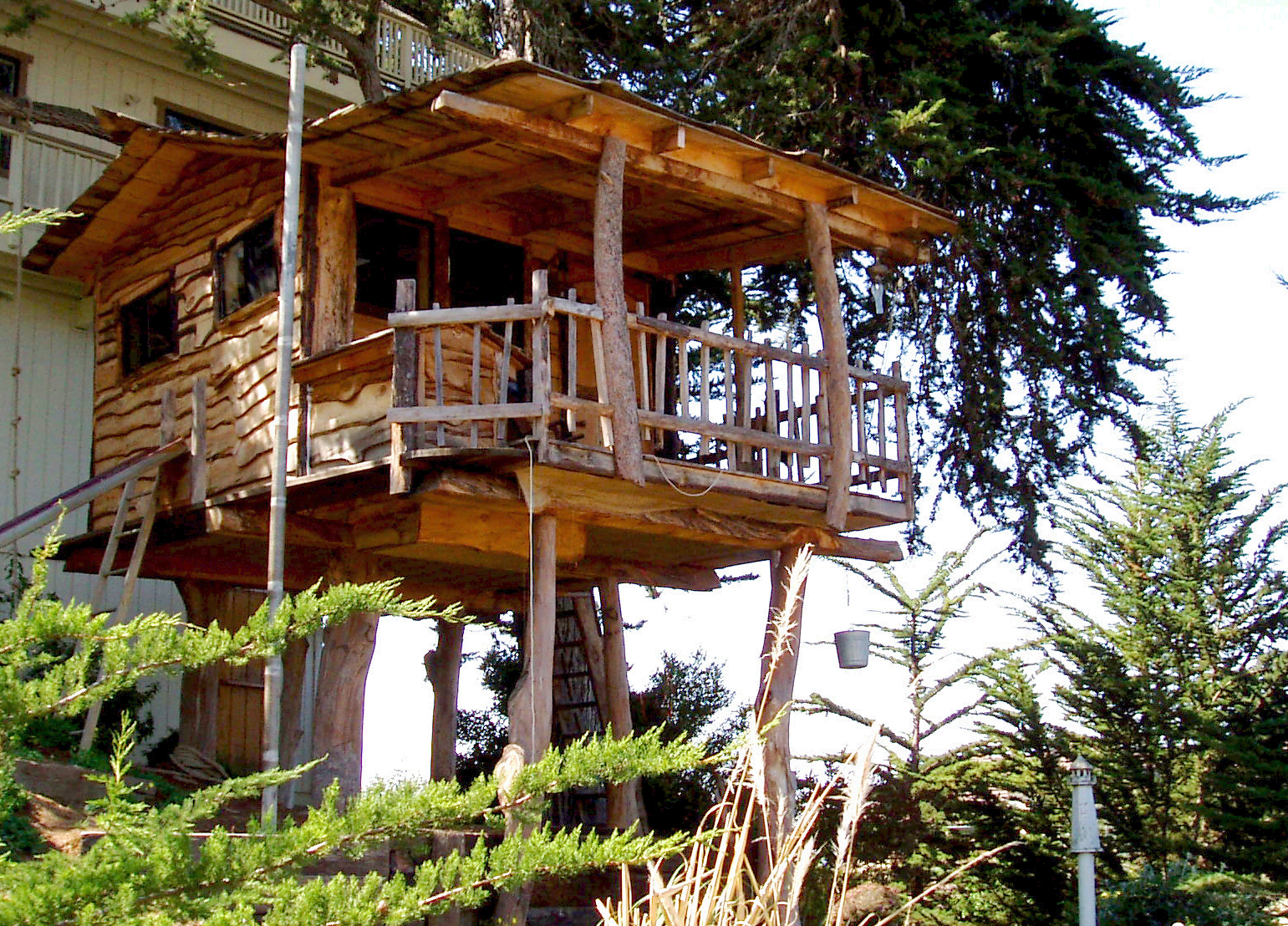
Tree house built for children

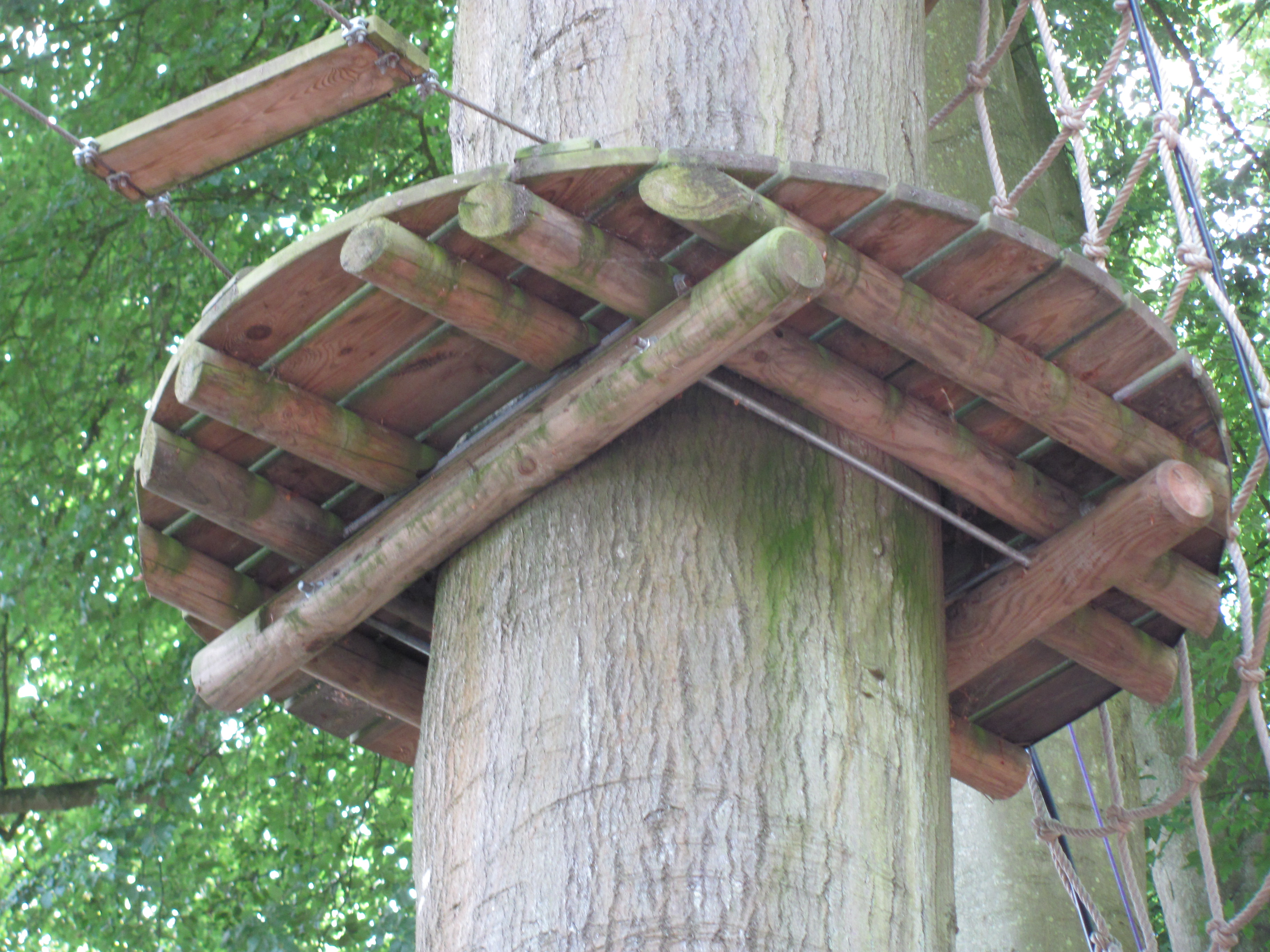
Noninvasive method of fixing a tree platform

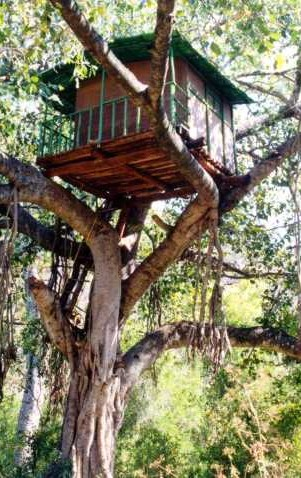
A treehouse in Marayur, Kerala, India

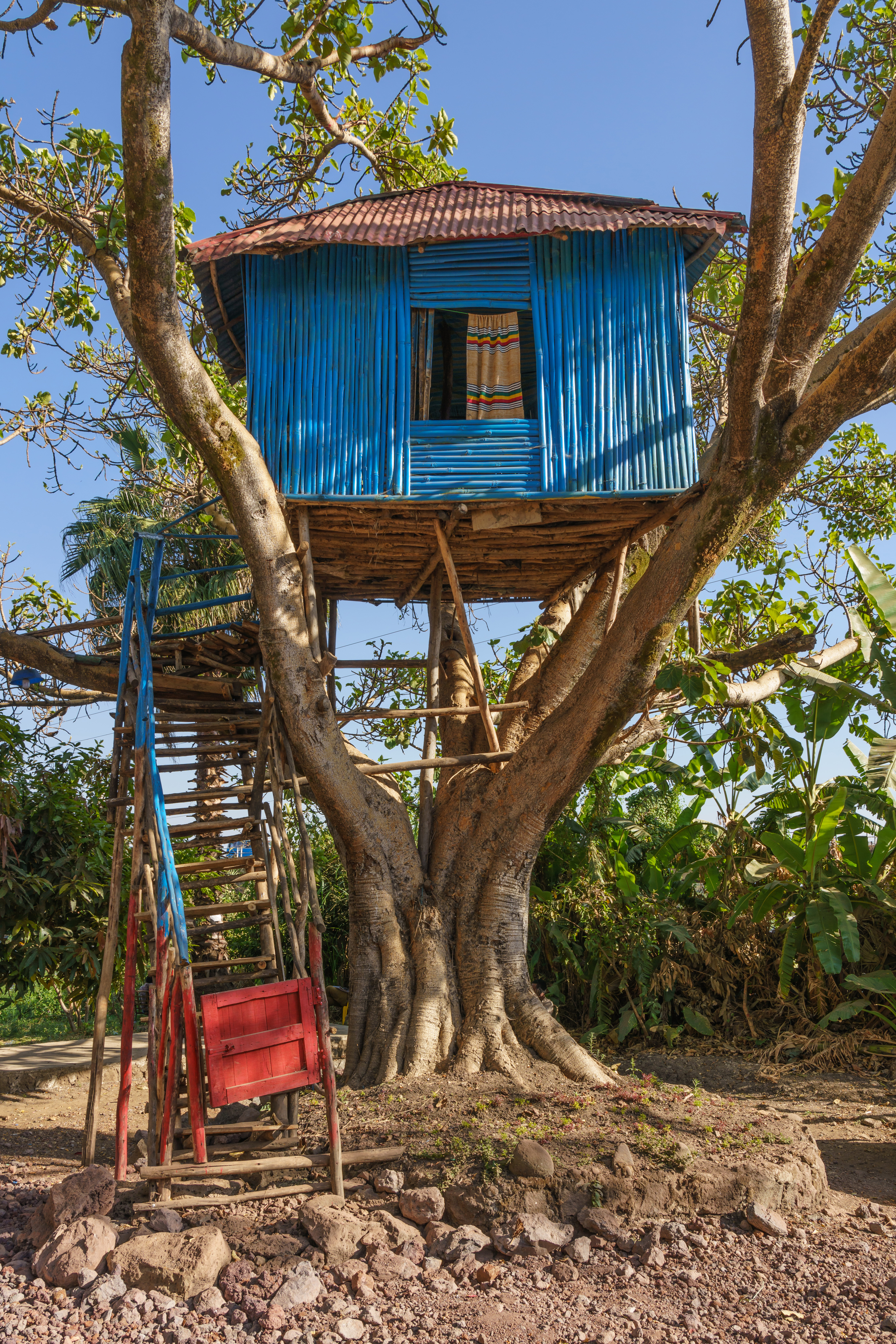
A tree house in Bahir Dar, Ethiopia

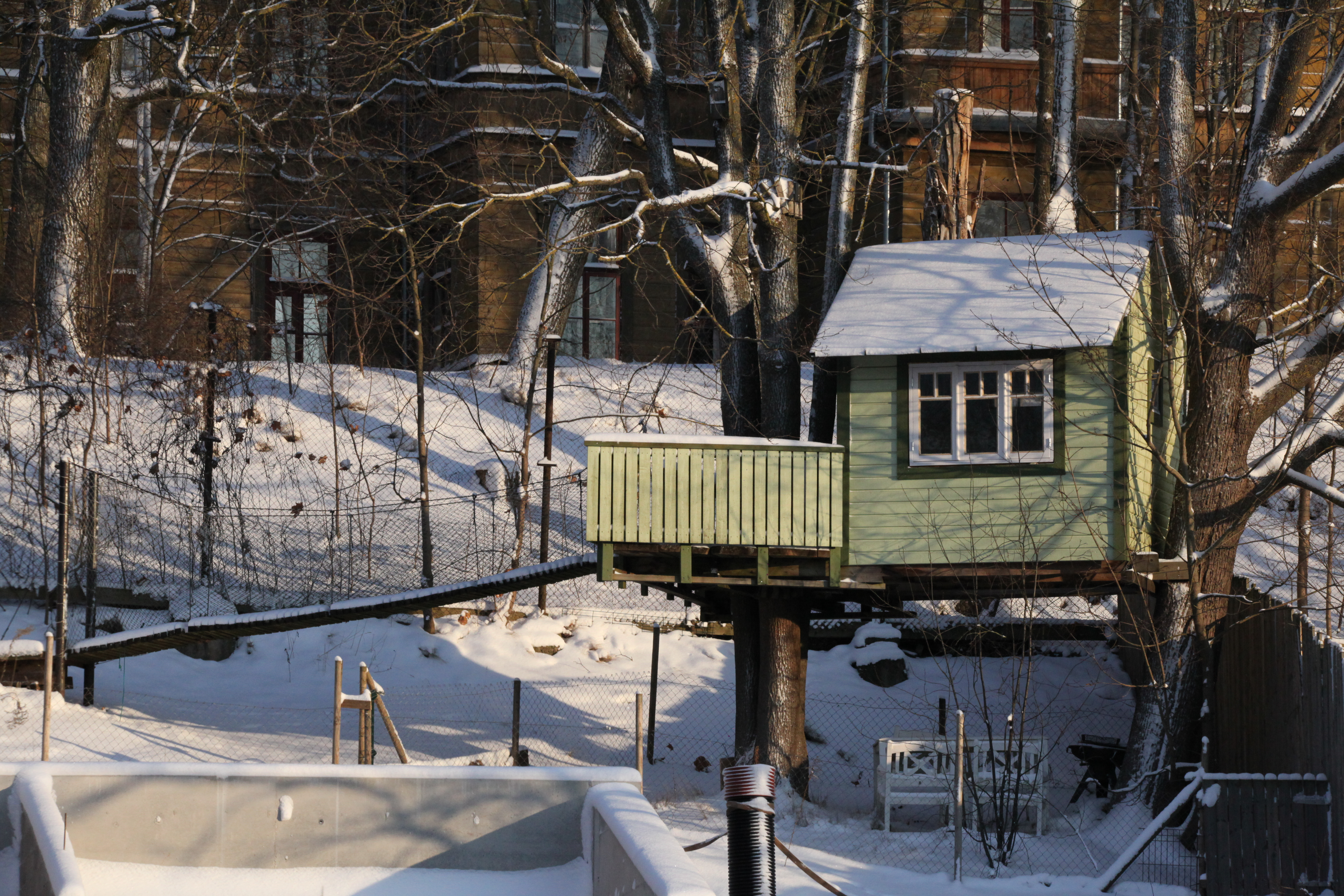
A tree house in Tartu, Estonia

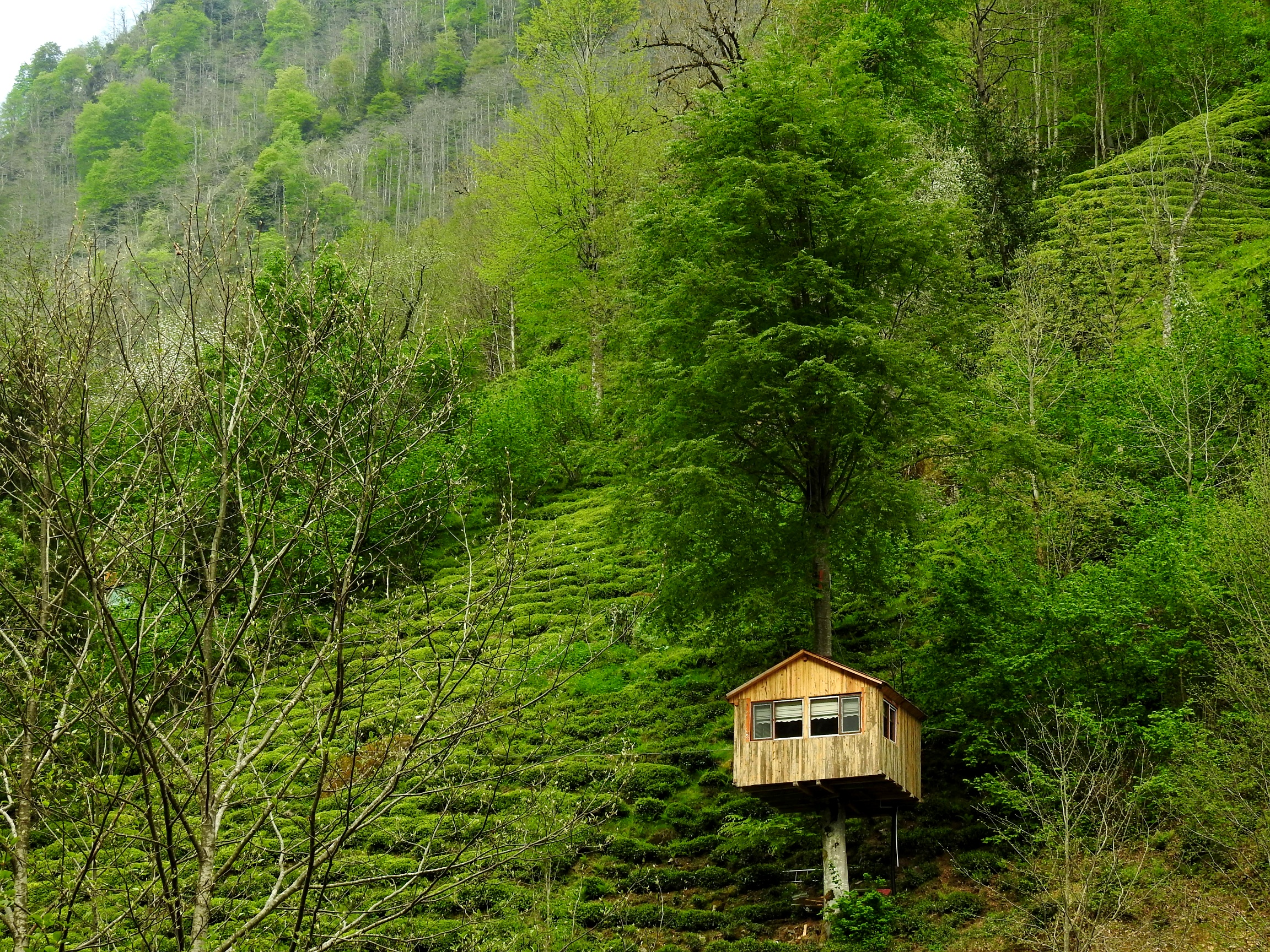
A tree house in Turkey

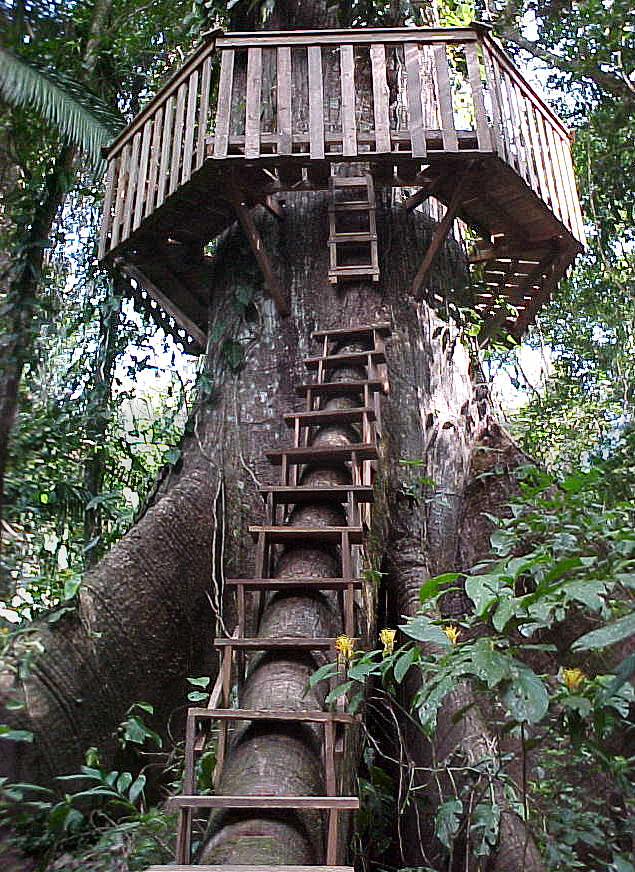
A stairway and roundwalk

== See also ==
- Cubby-hole
- Fab Tree Hab – hypothetical ecological home design
- Nest
- Out'n'About – a tree house oriented bed and breakfast in Cave Junction, Oregon
- Stilt house
- Tree climbing
- Treefort Music Fest
- Treehouse Masters, an American TV series featuring a builder of custom treehouses
- Treetops Hotel – a noted hotel in Aberdare National Park in Kenya built as a treehouse
- Wendy house
