= Allouville-Bellefosse =

- Commune
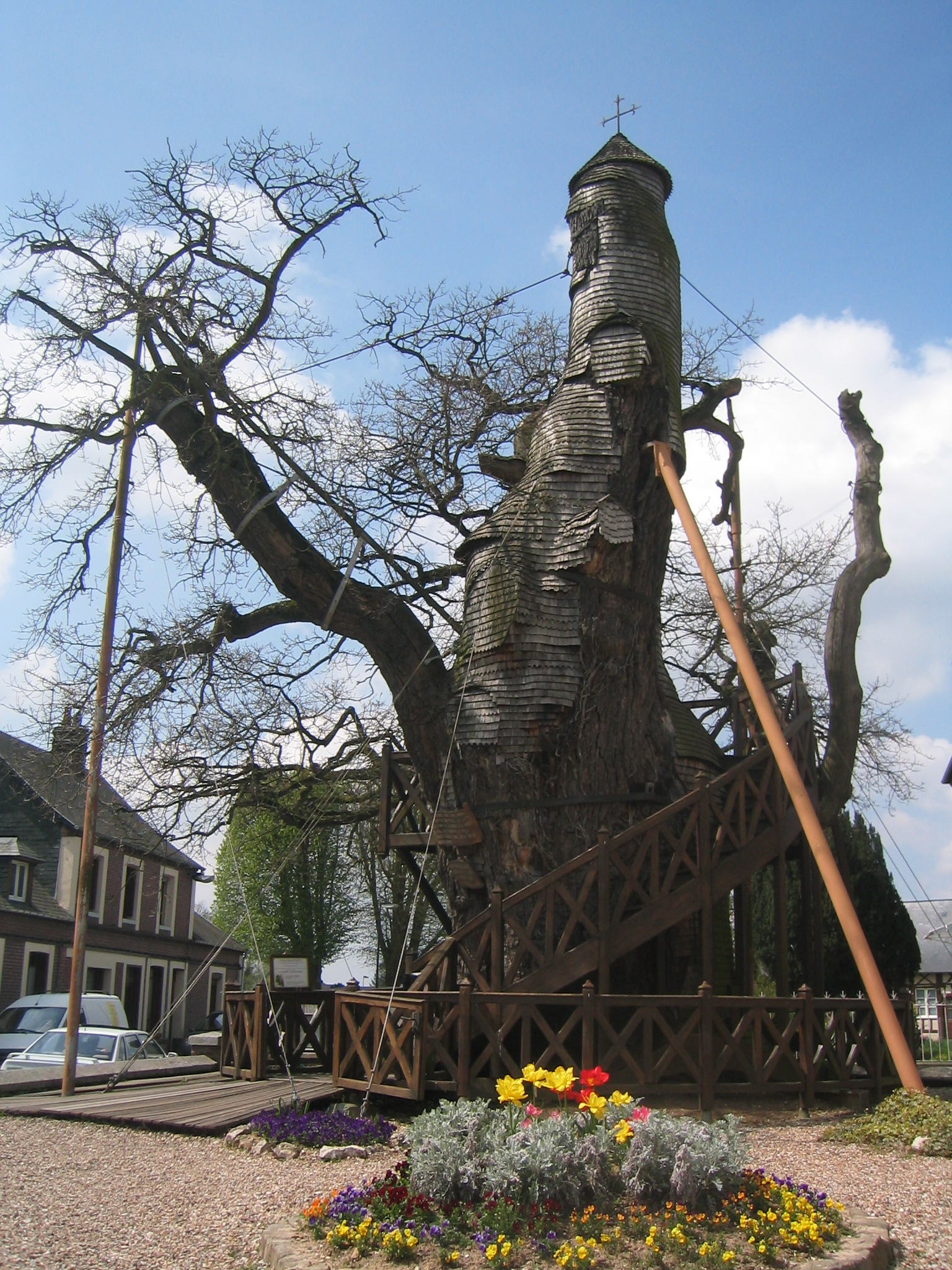
- Thousand-year-old oak tree
- Location of Allouville-Bellefosse
- Location within France Location within Normandy
- Coordinates: 49°35′48″N 0°40′39″E
- Country: France
- Region: Normandy
- Department: Seine-Maritime
- Arrondissement: Rouen
- Canton: Yvetot

Government
  - Mayor (2020–2026): Didier Terrier
- Area^{1}: 14.66 km^{2} (5.66 sq mi)
- Elevation: 148 m (486 ft)
- Highest elevation: 154 m (505 ft)
- Lowest elevation: 114 m (374 ft)
- Population (2023): 1,153
  - Density: 78.65/km^{2} (203.7/sq mi)
- Time zone: UTC+01:00 (CET)
  - Summer (DST): UTC+02:00 (CEST)
- INSEE/Postal code: 76001 /76190
- ^{1} French Land Register data, which excludes lakes, ponds, glaciers > 1 km^{2} (0.386 sq mi or 247 acres) and river estuaries.

Allouville-Bellefosse (French pronunciation: [aluvil bɛlfos]) is a commune in the Seine-Maritime department, Normandy, northern France.

== Geography ==
A farming village situated in the Pays de Caux, some 30 miles (48 km) northwest of Rouen at the junction of the D33, D34 and the D110 roads.

== Population ==
Historical population
Year	Pop.	±% p.a.
1968	675	—
1975	661	−0.30%
1982	903	+4.56%
1990	1,007	+1.37%
1999	986	−0.23%
2007	1,044	+0.72%
2012	1,180	+2.48%
2017	1,157	−0.39%
2023	1,153	−0.06%
Source: INSEE

== Places of interest ==
- The church of St.Quentin, dating from the sixteenth century.
- Chêne chapelle, a 1000-year-old oak tree (the oldest in France). The tree houses two chapels, the lower dedicated to Notre Dame de la Paix and the upper called the Cellule de l'Eremite.
- The sixteenth-century abandoned church at Bellefosse.
- A natural history museum.
- The eighteenth-century château, in Louis XV style.
- Two manorhouses, at Bellefosse and Ismenil.

== See also ==
- Communes of the Seine-Maritime department
