= Château de Langeais =

Castle in Langeais, France

Coordinates: 47.3248°N 0.4061°E

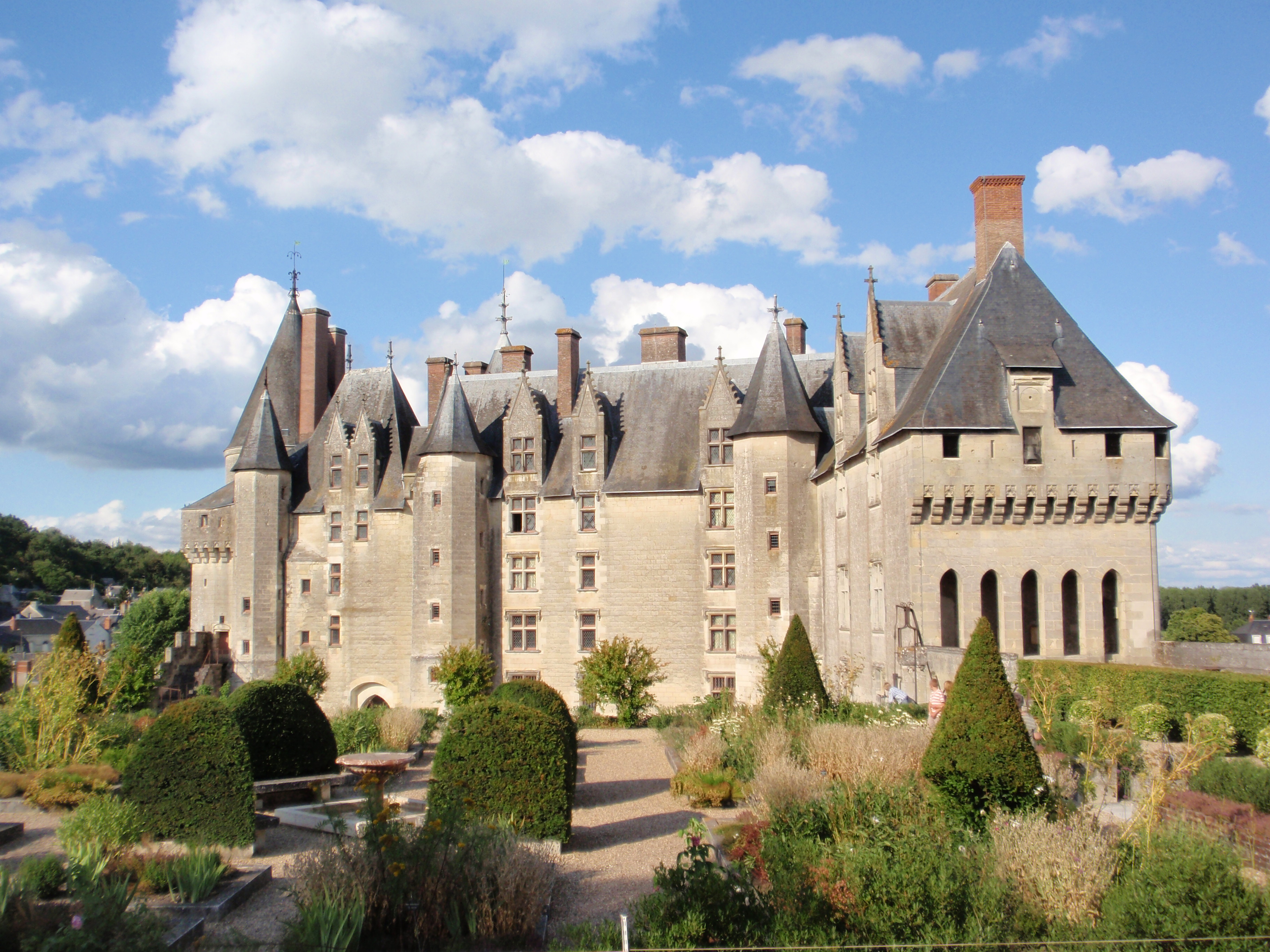
- Western facade (15th century)

General information
- Location: Langeais, France
- Construction started: 10th century
- Owner: Institut de France

Website
- chateau-de-langeais.com

The Château de Langeais is a 15th-century Flamboyant Gothic castle in Indre-et-Loire, France, built on a promontory created by the small valley of the Roumer River at the opening to the Loire Valley. Founded in 992 by Fulk Nerra, Count of Anjou, the castle was soon attacked by Odo I, Count of Blois. After the unsuccessful attack, the now-ruined stone keep was built; it is one of the earliest datable stone examples of a keep. Between 994 and 996, the castle was besieged unsuccessfully twice more. During the conflict between the counts of Anjou and Blois, the castle changed hands several times, and in 1038 Fulk captured the castle again.

After it was destroyed during the Hundred Years' War, King Louis XI (1461–1483) rebuilt Château de Langeais into what today is one of the best-known examples of late medieval architecture. It is especially noted for its monumental and highly decorated chimneypieces. Restored in the late 19th century, Château de Langeais came under the control of the Institut de France, who owns the site today. It is listed as a monument historique by the French Ministry of Culture and is open to the public.

== History ==
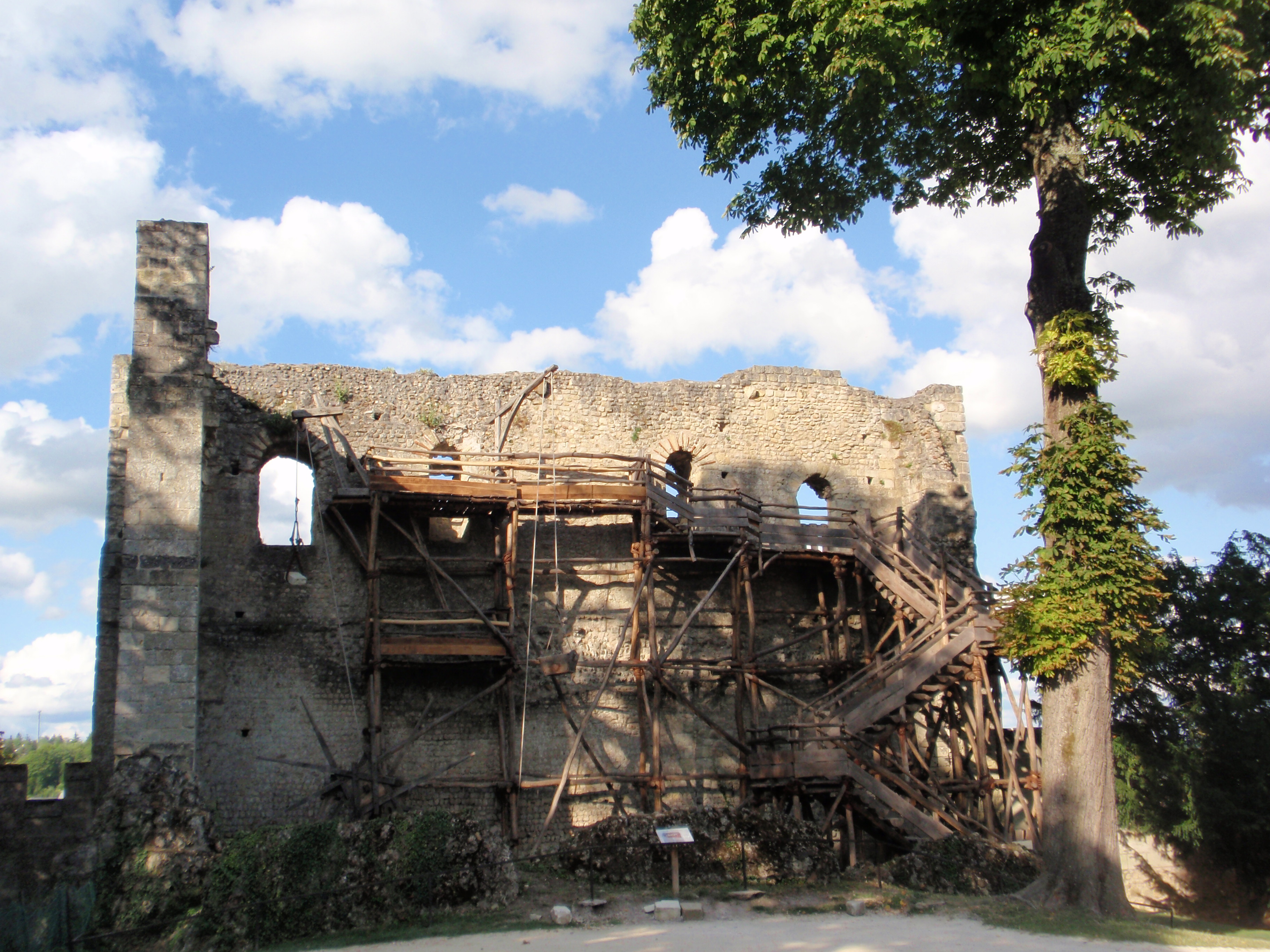
The ruins of the 10th-century keep, undergoing repairs

Aerial view

The 10th century saw the emergence of the castle, which is generally thought to be the second-earliest known, the earliest being Château de Doué-la-Fontaine built by the Count of Blois around 900. The counts of Anjou and Blois had bordering territories, and the powerful lords were rivals; as a result, the border area is home to some of the earliest-known castles. When it was founded in 992 by Fulk Nerra, Count of Anjou, Château de Langeais was made from wood and took the form of a motte-and-bailey. A contemporary chronicler noted that it was built because "[Fulk] had no resting place between Bourgueil and Amboise along the Loire river". It also had the advantage of being 24 km (15 mi) from Tours, a town under the control of Odo I, Count of Blois.

While the land belonged to Fulk, the area was under the control of Odo. When news of the fortification reached Odo he dispatched a force to destroy it. The attack was unsuccessful, and Fulk reinforced the site, building the stone keep in ruins today. To distract Odo from the construction work, which was complete by 994, Fulk carried out intermittent raids on his lands. It has been suggested that the keep's shallow foundations and thin walls, 2 m (6 ft 7 in) at their thickest and on average 1.5 m (4 ft 11 in), demonstrate that it was built in haste.

Though unsuccessful in 992, Odo again tried to capture the castle two years later. This time he called on his Norman, Flemish and Aquitanian allies and the siege of Château de Langeais began in the spring of 994. Fulk led the garrison himself and sent a message to Hugh Capet, King of the Franks, asking for help, and, though Hugh was ill, he promised reinforcements. In the meantime, Odo's numbers grew as his allies continued to flock to him. The siege continued into the summer, and Fulk began negotiating with Odo. Richer, a contemporary chronicler favourable to Odo, asserted that Fulk agreed to surrender but later reneged, claiming the agreement was not binding, though it is uncertain whether this was the case. However, the Capetian forces arrived before Fulk was forced to surrender. Faced with the king's army, Odo agreed to leave Fulk in peace.

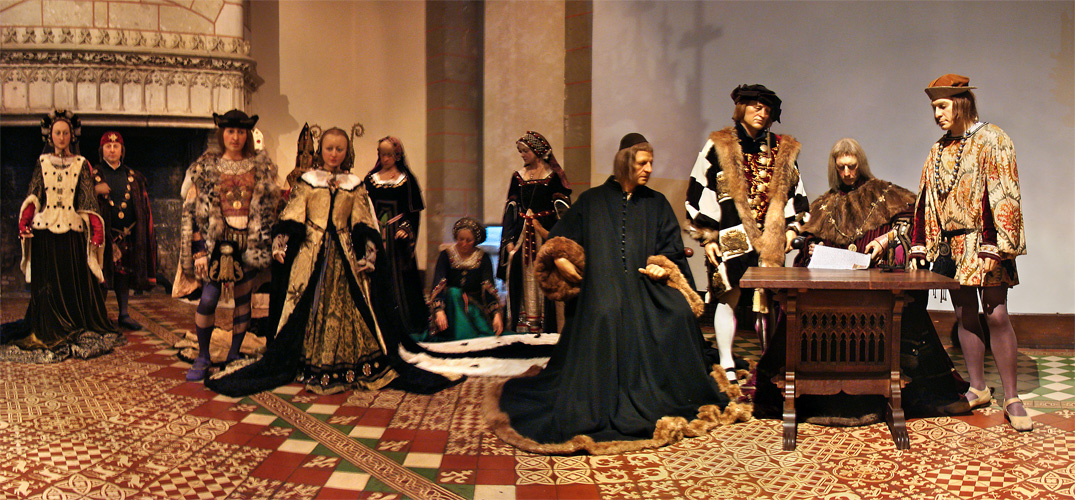
Modern tableau of the marriage of Anne of Brittany to King Charles VIII

After the siege ended and Odo retreated, Fulk had to deal with hostilities along the western frontier of his lands. Despite Odo's agreement with Hugh, the Count of Blois exploited Fulk's divided attention to install a force at Château de Châteaudun from which he could move to capture Langeais should the opportunity arise. Odo besieged Château de Langeais in 995. The siege continued into the next year, but in March 996, Odo fell ill and died. With their leader dead, the besieging force left Langeais. With his most troublesome enemy dead, Fulk captured Tours, which had previously been held by the Count of Blois. After Robert, King of the Franks, had taken control of Tours, Fulk turned to the castles of Langeais, Montsoreau, Montrésor and Montbazon to defend the Loire Valley.

Hostilities between the counts of Anjou and Blois were renewed in 1016. During the course of the conflict, Fulk lost control of three castles: Passavant was destroyed, and Montbazon and Langeais were probably captured. By 1032 Château de Langeais was back under Fulk's control. However, it was again taken by the forces of Odo II, Count of Blois. Odo II died in battle in 1037 and was succeeded by his son, Theobald; on receiving the news of his rival's demise, Fulk set about recapturing Château de Langeais. The siege began in the winter of 1037 and, with no relief forthcoming, the garrison surrendered in the spring of the following year. Fulk set his sights on further territorial gains and successfully captured Château de Chinon 22 km (14 mi) away.

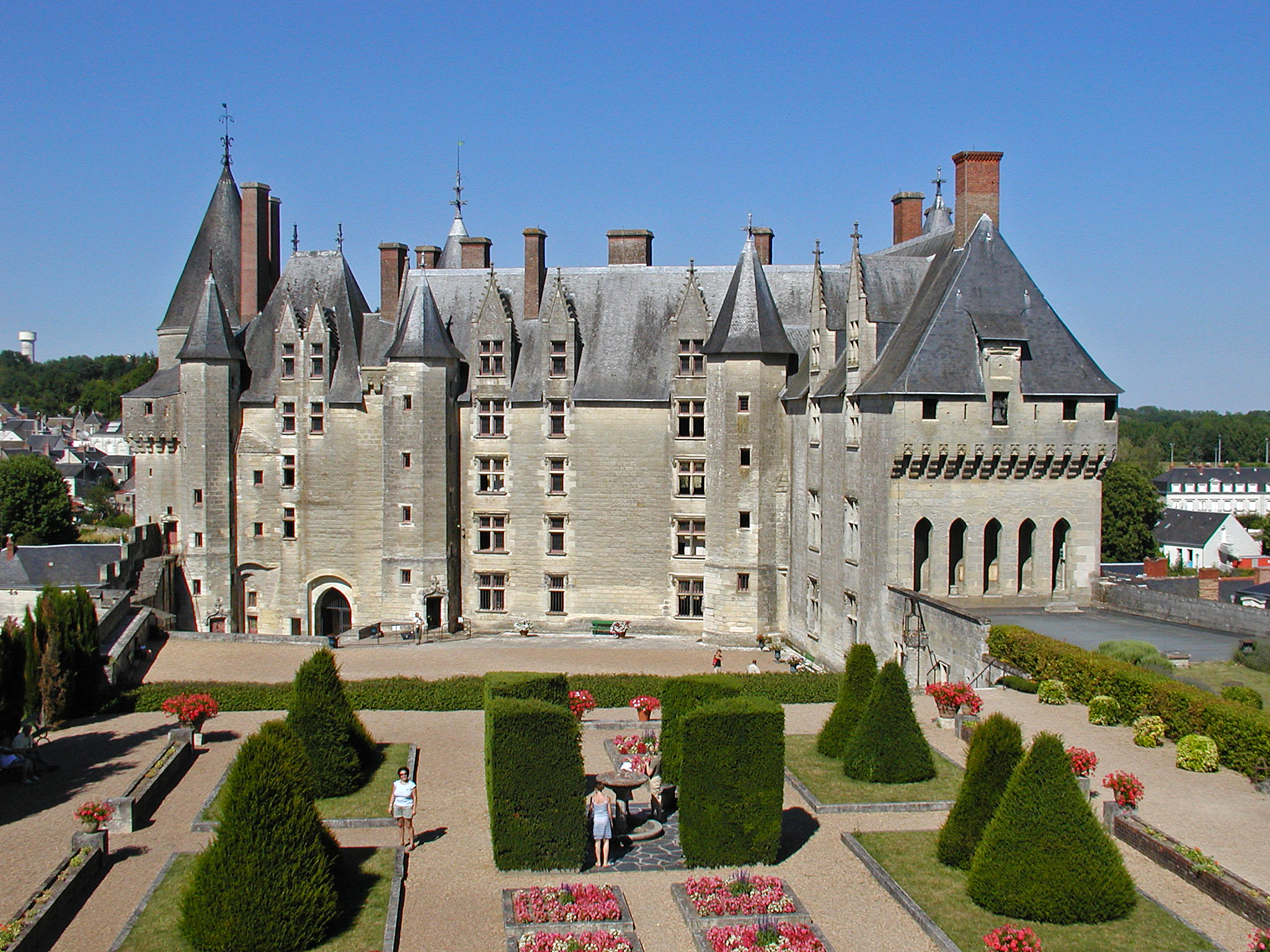
The château was rebuilt in the 15th century.

Under the Plantagenet kings, the château was fortified and expanded by Richard I of England (Richard the Lionheart). However, King Philippe II of France recaptured the château in 1206. Eventually, though, the English destroyed it during the Hundred Years' War. The château was rebuilt about 1465 during the reign of Louis XI. The great hall of the château was the scene of the marriage of Anne of Brittany to King Charles VIII on 6 December 1491, which permanently united Brittany and France.

In 1886 Jacques Siegfried bought Château Langeais and began a restoration programme. He installed an outstanding collection of tapestries and furnishings and bequeathed the château to the Institut de France, which still owns it today. The château is open to the public. It is listed as a monument historique by the French Ministry of Culture.

== Layout ==
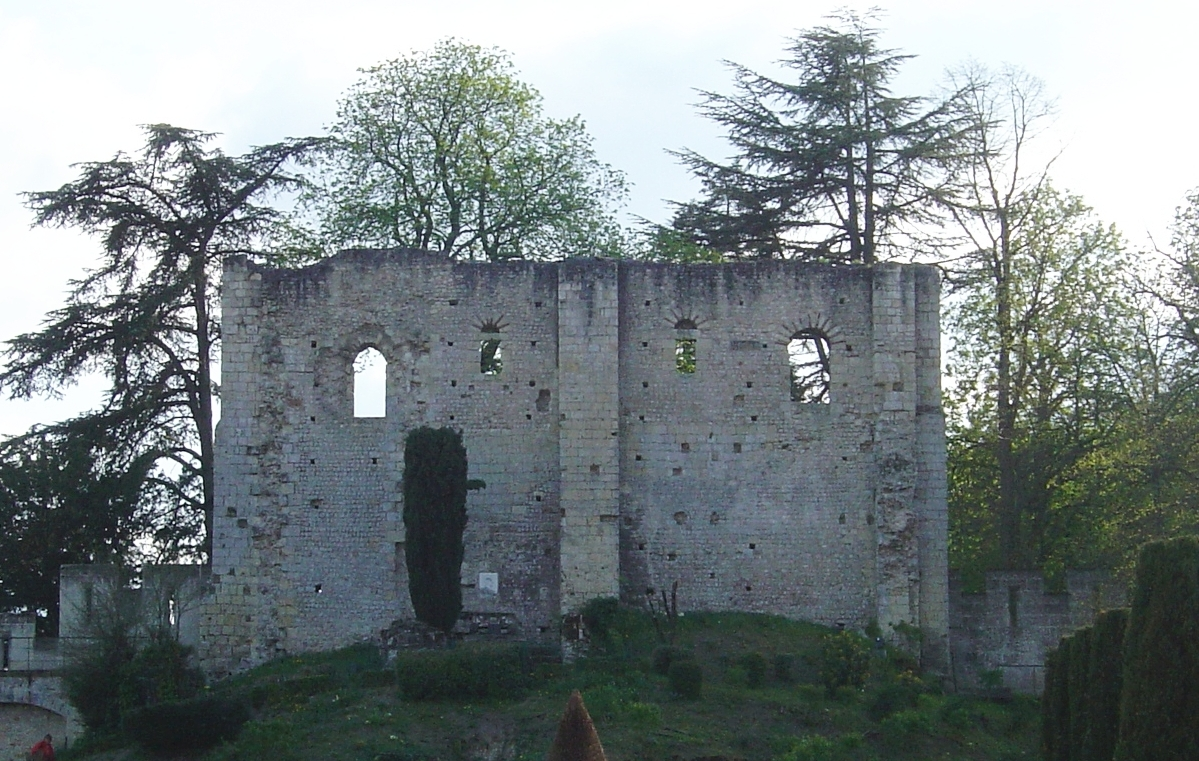
The north-east face of the 10th-century keep

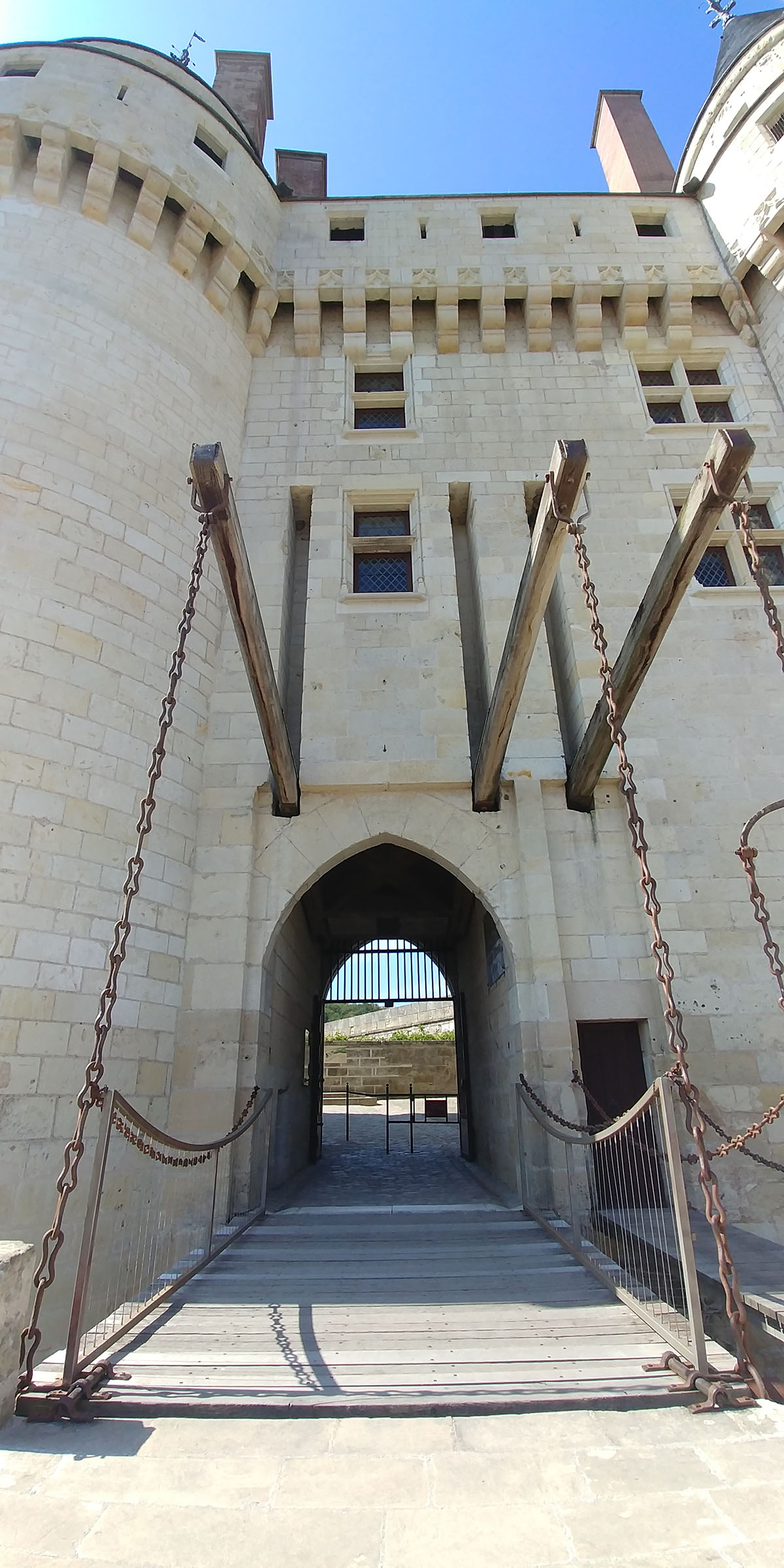
Drawbridge

According to contemporaneous chronicler Richer, the castle built by Fulk Nerra in the 990s consisted of a tower and a surrounding enclosure. The 10th-century keep still stands, albeit in a ruinous state. It is the earliest example of Romanesque architecture in the region. It is uncertain where the stone used in construction was quarried. A detailed study has been done on the cost of construction of the tower. It is 16 metres (52 ft) high, 17.5m wide, and 10m long with walls averaging 1.5m thick. The walls contain 1,200 cubic metres (42,000 cu ft) of stone and have a total surface area (both inside and out) of 1,600 square metres (17,000 sq ft). The tower is estimated to have taken 83,000 average working days to complete, most of which was unskilled labour. The wall enclosing the keep stretched for some 250 m (820 ft). The interior rooms are richly decorated.

== See also ==
- Châteaux of the Loire Valley
- List of castles in France
