= Treehouse attachment bolt =

Engineered bolt for attaching tree houses to trees

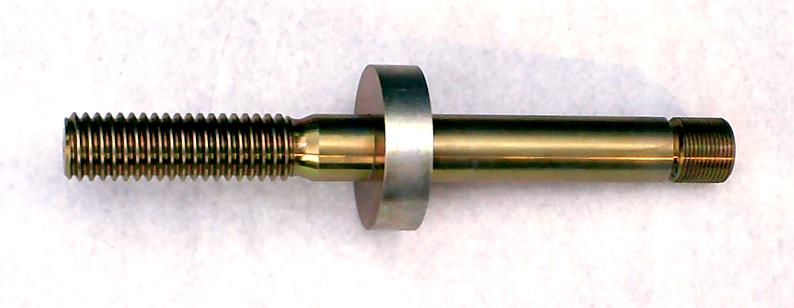
A Garnier limb (GL)

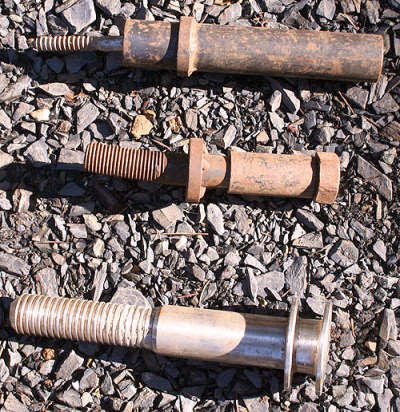
Early GL Prototypes

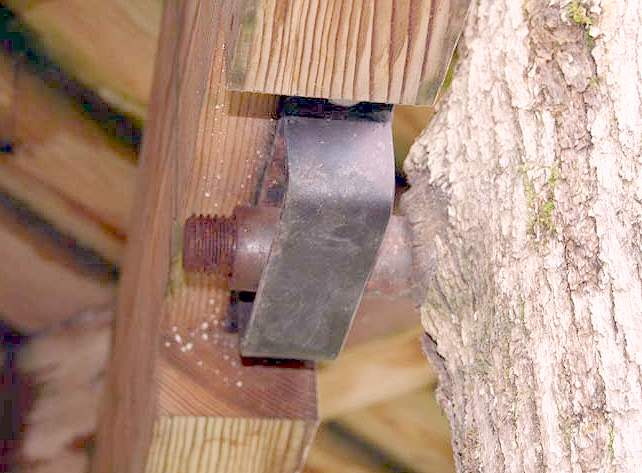
An example of tree growth over time, enveloping an older GL, beam & bracket

Treehouse attachment bolts or TABs are specialized bolts engineered for treehouse construction. Various models and trademarks exist, with names such as Garnier limbs (GLs); tree anchor bolts; artificial limbs; heavy limbs or hyper limbs (HLs); special tree fasteners or stud tree fastener (STFs).

They may be either of through fastener style (for smaller trees) or side mount type for larger ones.

== Description ==
One of the main features of TABs is their strength, requiring fewer tree penetrations for robust fastening of a treehouse and hence less damage to a live tree. A typical TAB consists of a threaded metal bolt, a larger diameter collar, and a long perch terminated with a nut. The collar provides additional bending strength by bearing upon the compression strength of the tree grain. The long perch allows for lumber to be positioned away from the tree, providing clearance for radial growth. Since treehouses are subject to frequent load reversal produced by winds, TABs must be made of spring steel The bolts are able to support from between 9,000 and 12,000 pounds (4,100 and 5,400 kg), a much greater load than conventional lag bolts.

TABs are commonly used in conjunction with pipe brackets, allowing the treehouse structure to move independently with the tree. TABs are designed so a tree's added girth can further envelop it.

== History ==
The concept of using a collar or large cylindrical object to increase shear strength in wood construction has been around for several centuries in the forms of split rings and shear plates. Shear plates provide a larger load-carrying capacity in shear than can be otherwise achieved by a bolt alone. Because this idea utilized less bolts for equal strength, it transferred well into the use of live trees, as they compartmentalize more efficiently with a single, larger cut than several, smaller cuts. Michael Garnier became involved in treehouse construction beginning in 1990 when he built his first treehouse in Josephine County, Oregon. Two years later, he was ordered by County official to close the treehouse to the public. He began developing what would become the Garnier limb, a high-strength alloy steel engineered bolt that can be screwed into a bore in the trunk of tree. In 1997 Garnier met Arborist Scott D. Baker who shared his knowledge of tree biology and tree structural responses. By 1998, Garnier had developed a commercial bolt product which he called Artificial Limbs. The Garnier limb was primarily developed to satisfy the safety requirements of the Josephine County Building and Safety building permit process.

Engineer Charley Greenwood, with the help of Michael Garnier and machinist Michael Birmingham, added a 3-inch (76 mm) collar onto a 1.25-inch (32 mm) hex cap screw to maximize the surface area and minimize compression in the contact area between the tree and the screw. Garnier was initially the sole producer of these bolts under the names, "Artificial Limbs" and "Garnier Limb".
