= Château de Doué-la-Fontaine =

Coordinates: 47.1879°N 0.2804°W

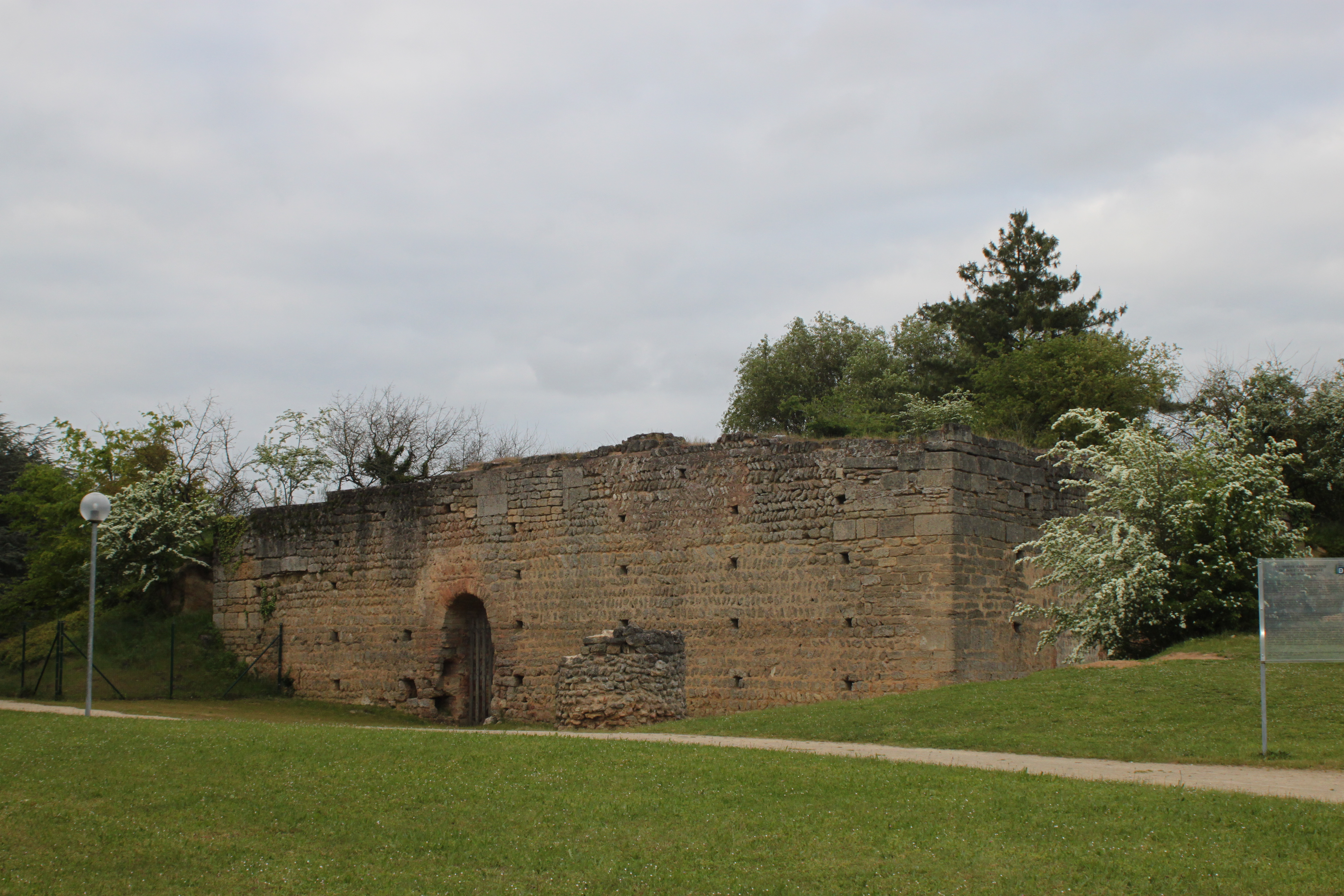
- Surviving ruins of the aula, which later became a prison and then a cellar
- Interactive map of the Château de Doué-la-Fontaine area

General information
- Location: France
- Construction started: c. 950
- Renovated: 1468 and 1472
- Demolished: 1026

The Château de Doué-la-Fontaine, also known as Motte de la Chapelle and Doué-la-Fontaine Castle, is a motte and bailey castle in Doué-la-Fontaine, France that was built upon the foundations of an older 9th century Carolingian aula (hall). The later castle, built around the year 950, is widely believed to have been the oldest known castle built out of stone. Only the aula survives today, while the castle and most of the motte no longer survive.

== History ==
On the site of the castle, an older Carolingian aula was built during the 9th or early 10th century for the Count of Anjou and was owned at one point by King Robert I of France before his death in 923. The Carolingian building, which measured 23 metres (75 ft) by 17 metres (56 ft), consisted of a large room of one level (an aula), with walls 1.80 metres thick, was set on fire around 930–40, probably during a war between the counts of Anjou and the counts of Blois.

Around 950, the building was fortified by the Theobald I, Count of Blois by adding an upper floor with external entrance above the old aula, which was converted to a cellar. Evidence for the conversion during the 10th century is graffiti of that time written by an unknown man named Aimeri - all that is known about him is that he devoted this graffiti to King Louis the Pious.

Around 1000, the entire structure was buried within a motte (an earth mound) that was 5 metres (16 ft) tall and a donjon (keep) was built atop it. The buried building was partly used as a prison. The keep was burnt and destroyed in 1026 by Fulk Nerra.

The site was refortified in both 1468 and 1472, with no traces of these later fortifications surviving today.

=== Excavation ===
The motte was then known as "Motte de la Chapelle" and in 1966, the motte was going to be leveled by Michel de Boüard, but when a mechanical device gutted the mound and uncovered traces of masonry, the site was stopped and the ruins were excavated and it was made a historical monument on 19 December 1973. Most of the motte was still eventually flattened to expose as much of the ruins of the aula as possible.

== Gallery ==
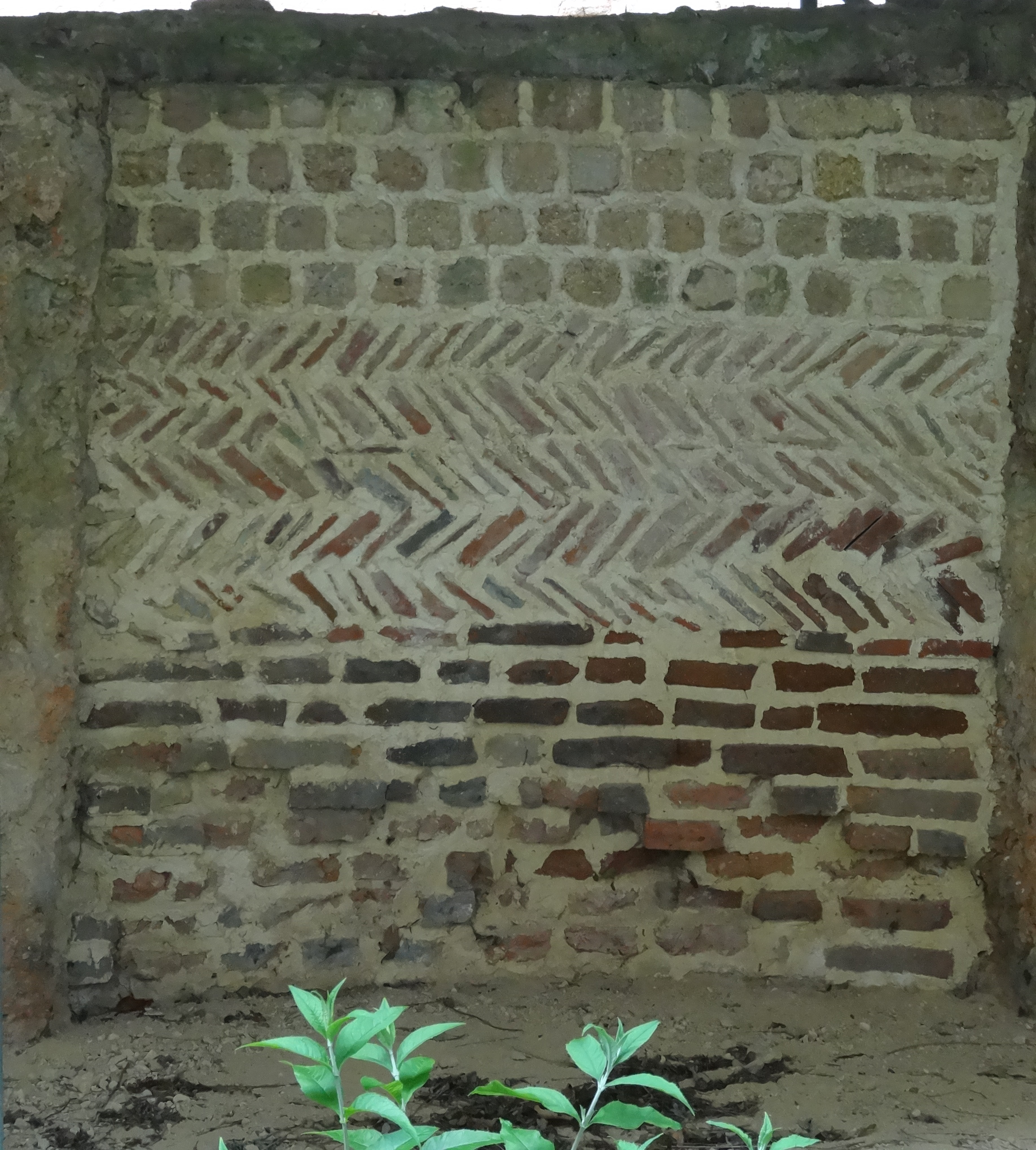
Fireplace

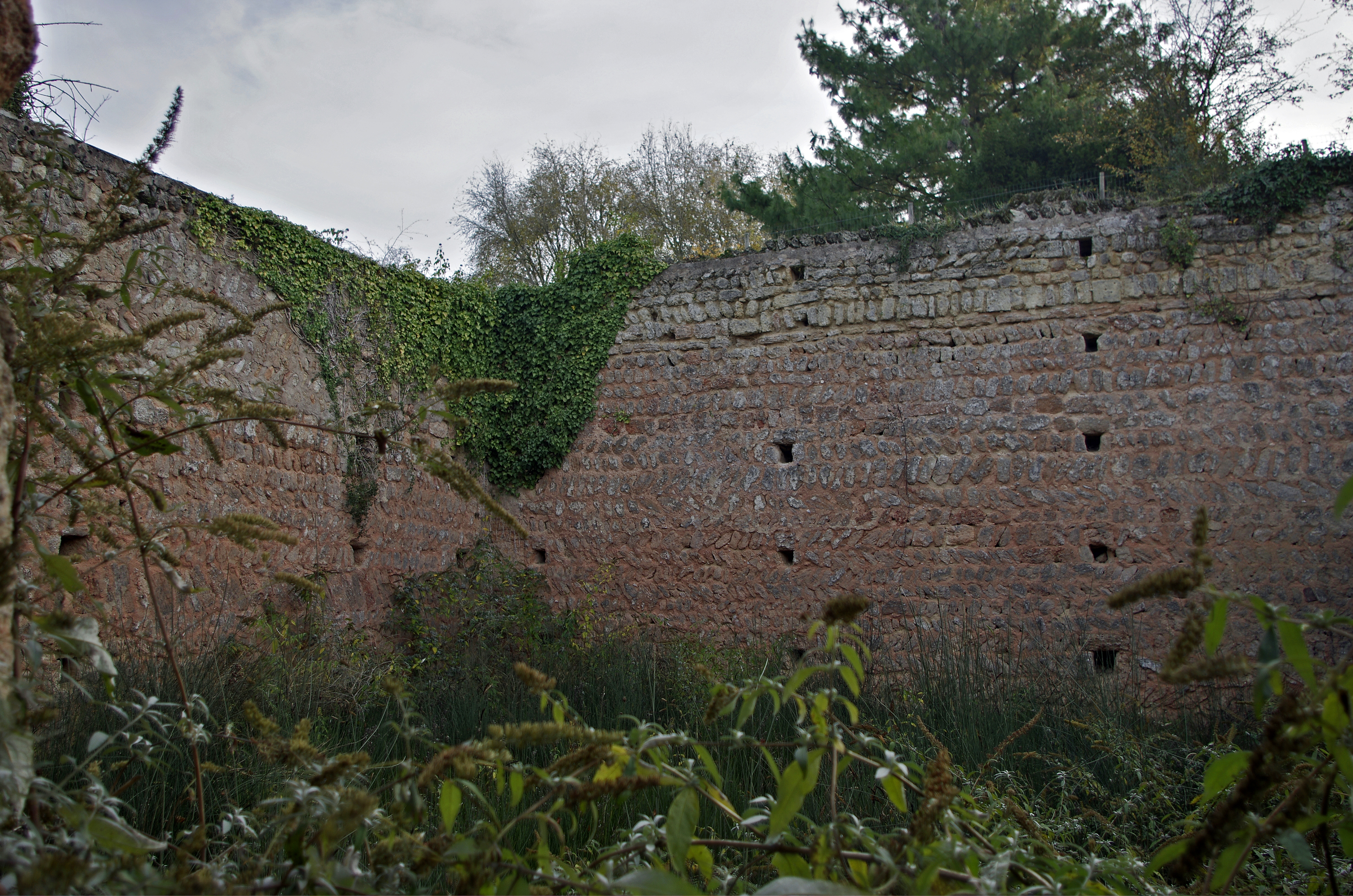
Inside view of the ruined aula

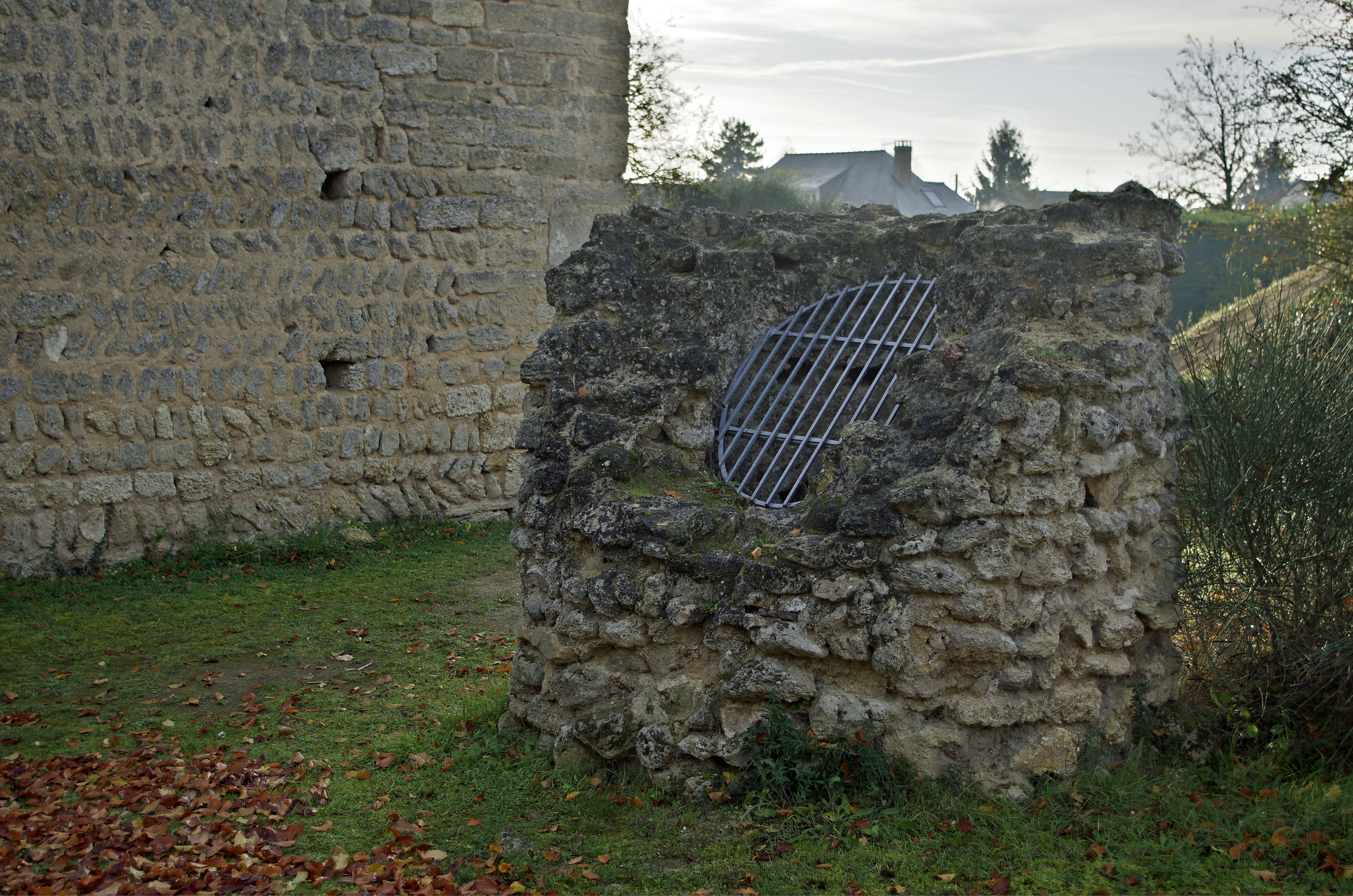
Ruins of a well(?)

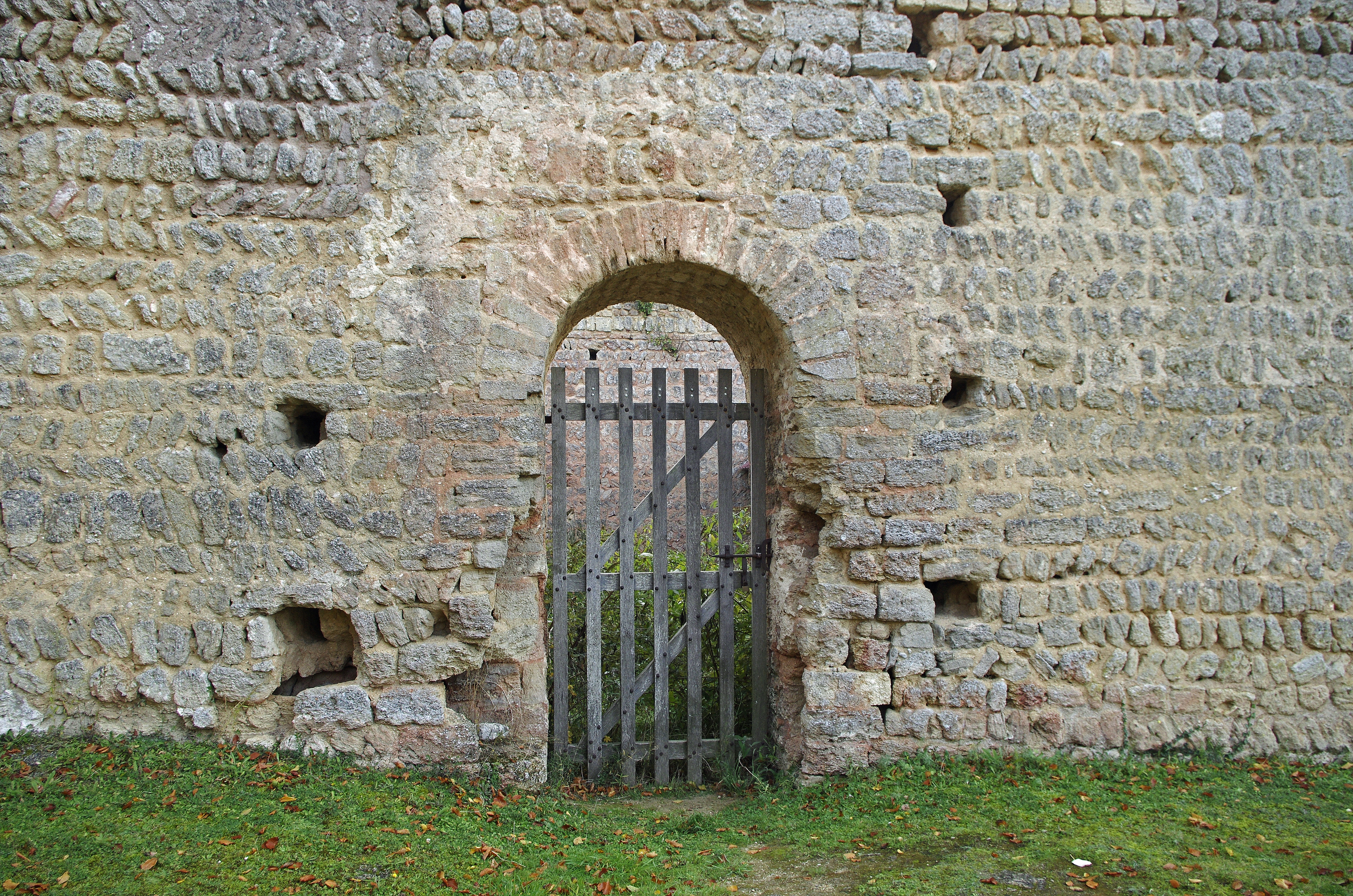
Close-up view of the doorway
