= U.S. Route 199 =

Highway in California and Oregon

U.S. Route 199
- Redwood Highway
- US 199 highlighted in red

Route information
- Auxiliary route of US 99
- Maintained by Caltrans and ODOT
- Length: 79.74 mi (Note: Oregon length references) (128.33 km)
- Existed: 1926–present

Major junctions
- South end: US 101 near Crescent City, CA
- SR 197 near Houchi, CA; OR 46 in Cave Junction, OR; OR 260 near Grants Pass, OR; OR 99 in Grants Pass, OR; OR 238 in Grants Pass, OR
- North end: I-5 in Grants Pass, OR

Location
- Country: United States
- States: California, Oregon
- Counties: CA: Del Norte; OR: Josephine

Highway system
- United States Numbered Highway System; List; Special; Divided
- State highways in California; Interstate; US; State; Scenic; History; Pre‑1964; Unconstructed; Deleted; Freeways
- Oregon Highways; Interstate; US; State; Named; Scenic
← SR 198	CA	→ SR 200
← US 197	OR	→ OR 200

U.S. Route 199 (US 199) is a U.S. Highway in the states of California and Oregon. The highway was established in 1926 as a spur of US 99, which has since been replaced by Interstate 5 (I-5). US 199 stretches 80 miles (130 km) from US 101 near Crescent City, California northeast to I-5 in Grants Pass, Oregon. The highway is the northern portion of the Redwood Highway. In Oregon, US 199 is officially known as Redwood Highway No. 25. The majority of the road in California is the Smith River Scenic Byway, a National Forest Scenic Byway. The first roadway, a plank road, from Crescent City was established in May 1858, and before the US 199 designation was applied to the highway, the roadway was designated Highway 25 (in Oregon) and Route 1 (in California).

== Route description ==
US 199 is part of the National Highway System, a network of highways that are considered essential to the country's economy, defense, and mobility by the Federal Highway Administration.

=== California ===
The entire length of US 199 in California is defined in section 499 of the California Streets and Highways Code as Route 199, and that the highway is from "Route 101 near Crescent City to the Oregon state line via the Smith River".

US 199 begins at a partial interchange with US 101 northeast of Crescent City; Elk Valley Cross Road (County Route D2) connects the two routes just to the north for full access. The highway quickly enters the Jedediah Smith Redwoods State Park, climbs over a ridge, crosses the Smith River, and meets State Route 197 (SR 197), which heads northwest to US 101 via the Smith River. US 199 follows the banks of the river and its Middle Fork as it takes a steady but curvy climb through the Smith River National Recreation Area in the Six Rivers National Forest, passing the settlements of Hiouchi, Gasquet and Patrick Creek Lodge. As it approaches the summit, the Middle Fork Smith River turns east, but US 199 continues northeast, following Griffin Creek to near its source (where there is a rest area), and passing under Hazel View Summit, the border between the Smith River NRA and the Rogue River-Siskiyou National Forest, in the 1963 Collier Tunnel (elevation about 2,100 ft or 640 m). (The old curving route over the summit still exists as Oregon Mountain Road.) Upon leaving the tunnel, US 199 descends alongside the small Broken Kettle Creek into the Elk Valley and crosses into Oregon.

US 199 is part of the California Freeway and Expressway System and is eligible to be included in the State Scenic Highway System, though it is not officially designated as a state scenic highway by the California Department of Transportation.

=== Oregon ===
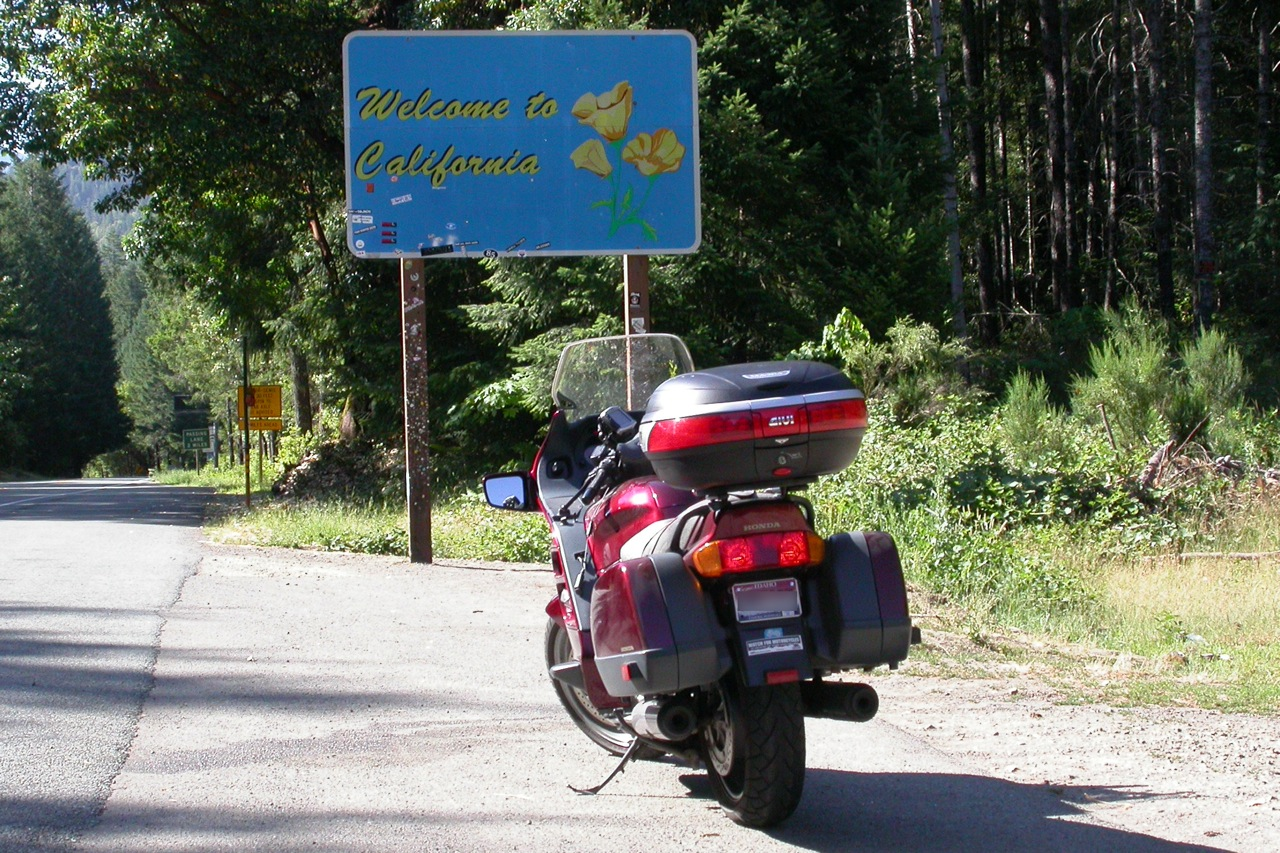
US 199 southbound at the California–Oregon state line

US 199 leaves Rogue River-Siskiyou National Forest as it enters Oregon and descends into the Illinois Valley, passing O'Brien and the west end of OR 46 in Cave Junction. North of Cave Junction, US 199 leaves the Illinois River, which curves west towards the ocean, and follows several small creeks past Selma to Hayes Hill Summit (elevation about 1,700 ft or 520 m). The highway descends from the summit alongside Slate Creek past Wonder and Wilderville and ends up in the Rogue River Valley, where it enters Grants Pass.

South of downtown Grants Pass, US 199 meets Oregon Route 99 (OR 99) and OR 238 and splits at a partial interchange. The main Redwood Highway turns north with OR 99, passing through downtown and ending at exit 58 on I-5, while the Redwood Spur No. 482, locally known as Grants Pass Parkway, continues straight, bypassing downtown to end at I-5 exit 55. Both of these are signed in both directions as US 199, while signage on US 199 itself at the split only shows "OR 99 north" for the mainline through downtown and "to I-5" for the bypass. On I-5, exit 55 is marked as "US 199", but exit 58 is "OR 99 to US 199". The Oregon Transportation Commission's defined routing of US 199 takes it along the main Redwood Highway through downtown, and the OTC calls the spur to exit 55 "US 199 Spur", but, consistent with signs on I-5 (but not on the surface), the Oregon Department of Transportation calls the spur US 199 and the downtown route OR 99 only.

The older route through downtown is a one-way pair on Sixth (southbound) and Seventh (northbound) streets, entirely overlapping OR 99 to I-5 exit 58, where OR 99 continues with I-5 to the north. The Caveman Bridge, a concrete through arch bridge built in 1927, carries Sixth Street over the Rogue River, while the parallel Seventh Street Bridge is a utilitarian bridge from 1960. The Grants Pass Parkway (Redwood Spur) also crosses the river on a four-lane bridge built in 1990; before that bypass was completed, the spur began downtown on E (southbound) and F (northbound) streets. Soon after the old and new routes join, the spur ends at a trumpet interchange with I-5 (exit 55).

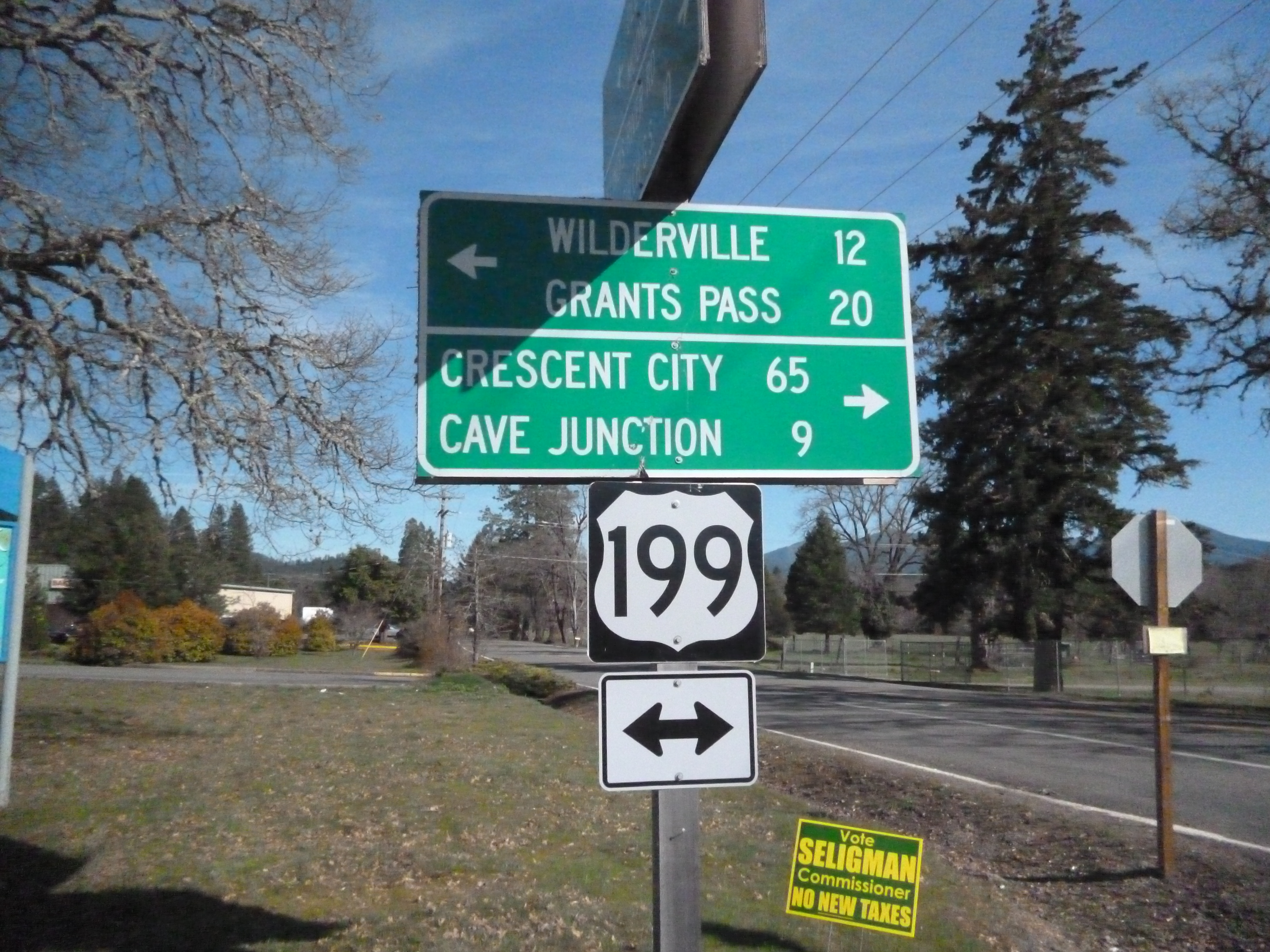
US 199 Oregon marker and sign

== History ==
By 1854, when it was incorporated, Crescent City had a population of 800 but no road leading inland. The Crescent City and Yreka Plank and Turnpike Company was incorporated at a meeting on June 10, and a survey was completed in October, but work stopped with the Panic of 1855. The corporation was revived in December 1856 as the Crescent City Plank Road and Turnpike Company, began construction of a plank road in 1857, and opened the road in May 1858. This road, shown on USGS topographic maps as Wimer Road, led northeast from Crescent City to the Smith River, where there was a toll booth, and then took a generally northerly route to near the state line, where it turned east, crossing back and forth between the states, to Oregon Mountain. There it turned northeast, following the Illinois River and branches past O'Brien and Waldo to north of Kerby. The final stretch ran easterly to Jacksonville via Wilderville, along the present US 199, Fish Hatchery Road, and OR 238.

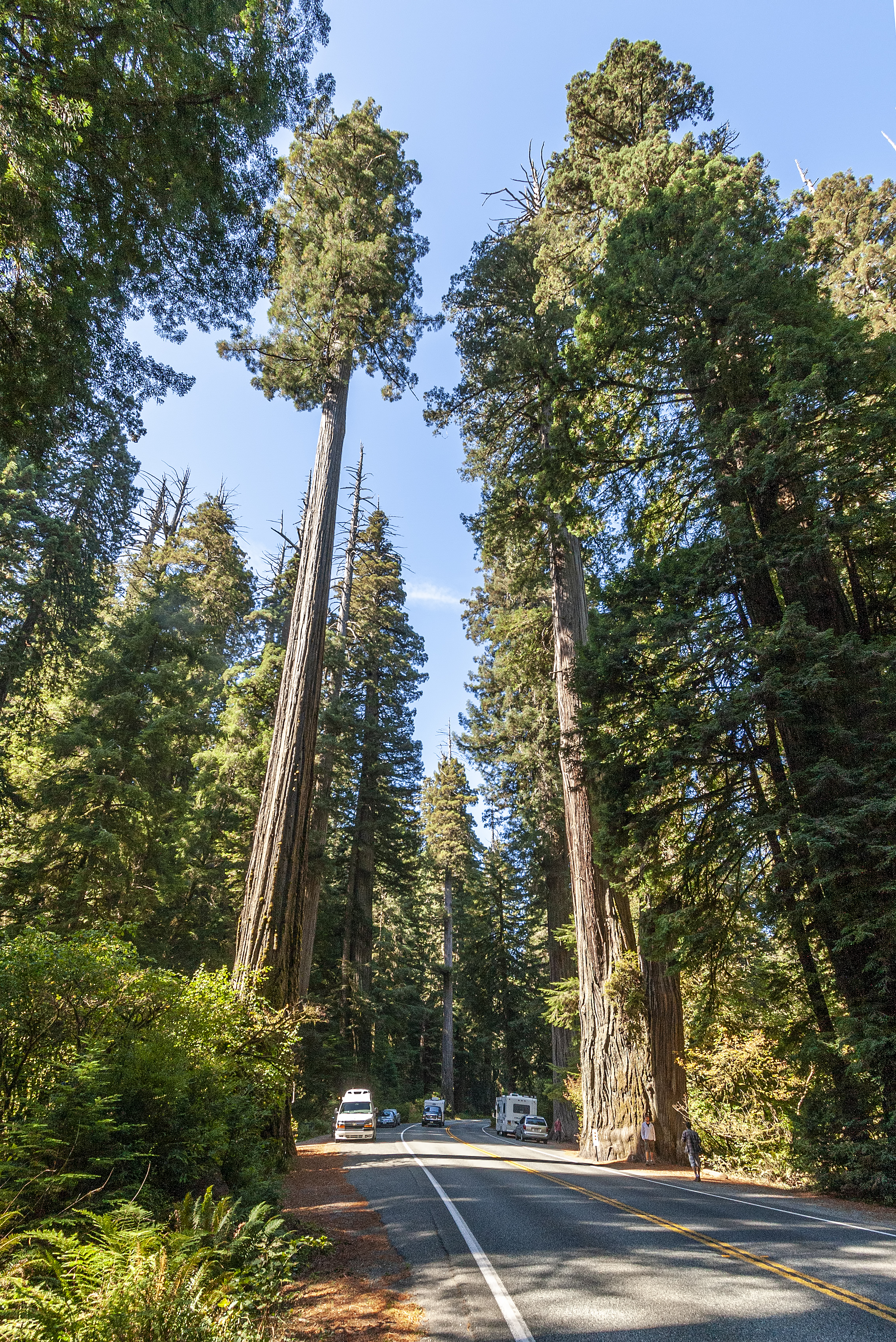
Simpson-Reed redwood grove in Jedediah Smith State Park, along US 199 near Crescent City, California

A second road in California was built by Horace Gasquet, who acquired a stand of trees at the present site of Gasquet, California — where the North and Middle Forks of the Smith River converge — in 1857. In 1881, he began to build a corduroy road from what had become Gasquet Flats to the plank road at the state line near Oregon Mountain, shown as Old Gasquet Toll Road on USGS maps. Tolls were charged starting in 1882, and in 1887 the road was completed. Gasquet also built a free road from Gasquet Flats along the Smith River to the mouth of the South Fork, including a suspension bridge across that waterway, and Del Norte County extended it along the Smith River and Mill Creek and over Howland Summit to the Crescent City Plank Road just east of Crescent City.

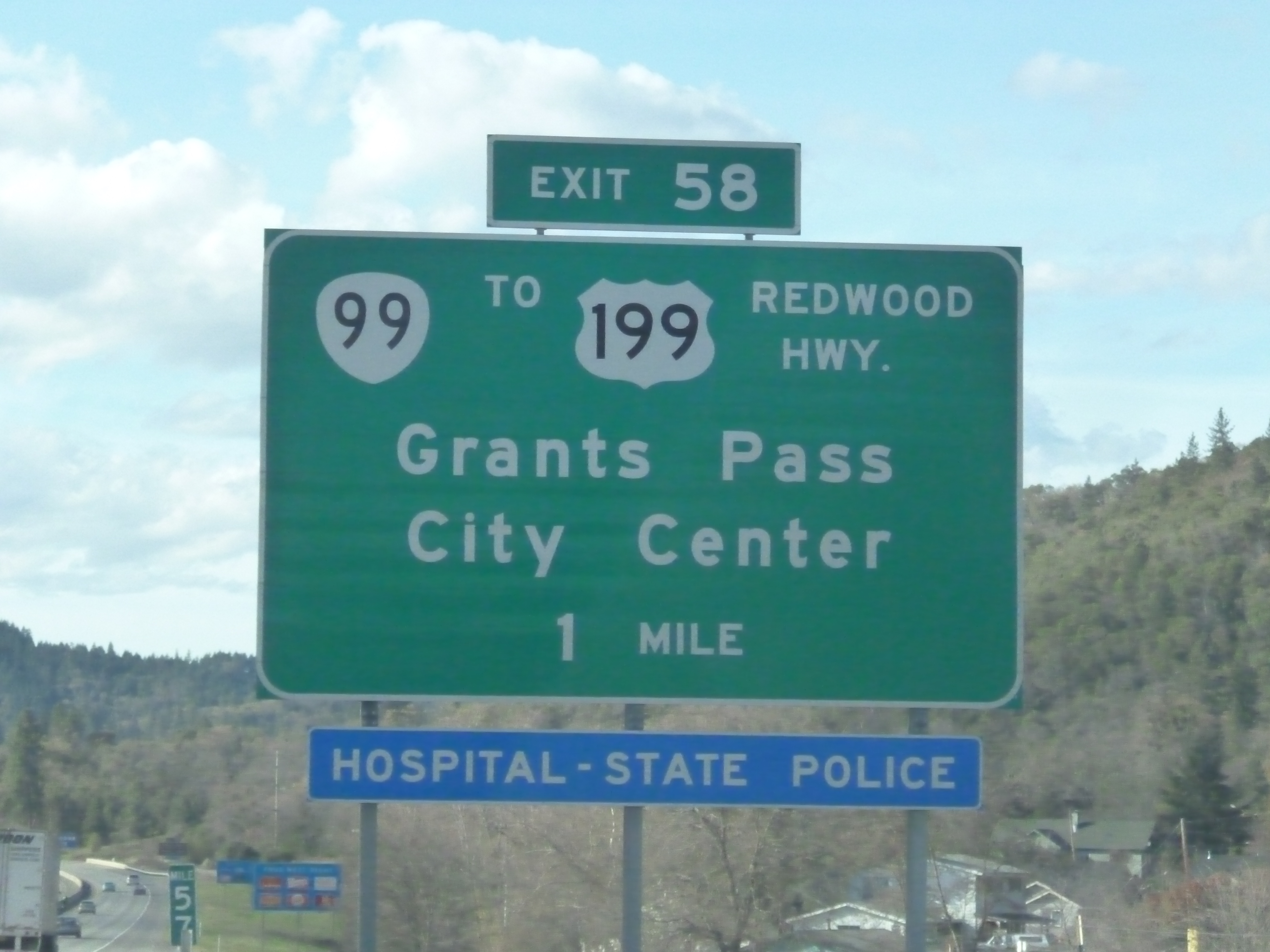
Exit Sign for US 199

As part of Oregon's initial state highway system, the road from Grants Pass southwest to Wilderville and then along the Crescent City Plank Road to the state line was named the Grants Pass-Crescent City Highway No. 25 in November 1917. At the time, the Grants Pass-Crescent City route, via the Gasquet Toll Road, was a narrow, winding unpaved mountain road with long grades and some remaining plank road in California. California added its portion to the state highway system in 1919, for the state's third highway bond issue, as an extension of Legislative Route 1. By 1924, the road was part of the Redwood Highway, which continued south to Sausalito, but was still completely unimproved between Crescent City and Waldo, Oregon. (Oregon changed the Grants Pass-Crescent City Highway name to Redwood Highway in May 1924.) A new highway between Gasquet and Kerby was completed by the two states in September 1926, and in June 1929 the new Hiouchi Bridge over the Smith River was dedicated, bypassing the remainder of the old road over Howland Hill. In 1948, US 199 became part of the Winnemucca to the Sea Highway, organized to promote the route that has largely become Nevada State Route 140 and Oregon Route 140 from I-80 at Winnemucca, Nevada to Crescent City. One major improvement to the highway's alignment was made after 1929: the Collier Tunnel replaced the winding route over Hazel View Summit in California on July 20, 1963.

Neither of the early designations — Highway 25 and Route 1 – was marked (signs posted by the California State Automobile Association used the Redwood Highway name), but in 1926 it became U.S. Route 199, a branch of US 99 from Grants Pass to US 101 in Crescent City. Oregon moved the Pacific Highway No. 1 from present OR 99 to I-5, which bypassed Grants Pass, in 1959, and the Redwood Highway No. 25 was extended north through downtown Grants Pass to I-5. A proposed branch on M Street to I-5 east of downtown was also included in Highway 25, but this was moved to the E and F Streets one-way pair in 1961. (I-5 here was built in the early 1960s, but US 99 remained on the old alignment.) On the California side of the state line, US 199 was added to the California Freeway and Expressway System in 1959 and the State Scenic Highway System in 1963; in the 1964 renumbering the Route 1 designation was dropped, making Route 199 the legislative number. Although US 299 and US 399 became state routes in 1964, the shorter US 199, which crossed a state line, remained. US 99 has since become Oregon Route 99 through Grants Pass, and US 199 now ends at I-5. The spur east from downtown Grants Pass to I-5 was built at the same time as I-5, and in 1991 it was moved from E and F Streets to bypass downtown on the new Grants Pass Parkway.

== Major intersections ==
State	County	Location	mi	km	Destinations	Notes
California	Del Norte		0.000	0.000	US 101 south – Crescent City	No direct access to US 101 north; southern terminus; US 101 exit 794 northbound.
California	Del Norte		0.292	0.470	Elk Valley Cross Road (CR D2) to US 101 north – Oregon Coast	
California	Del Norte		4.226	6.801	SR 197 (North Bank Road) to US 101 – Smith River, Oregon	
California	Del Norte		33.281– 33.621	53.561– 54.108	Collier Tunnel under Hazel View Summit	
California	Del Norte		35.521	57.166	Agricultural Inspection Station (southbound only)	
			36.166 0.00	58.204 0.00	California–Oregon state line; Redwood Highway No. 25 begins	
Oregon	Josephine	Cave Junction	12.62	20.31	OR 46 – Oregon Caves National Monument	
Oregon	Josephine		34.05	54.80	OR 260 (Riverbanks Road) – Robertson Bridge, Merlin, Griffin Park	
Oregon	Josephine	Grants Pass	40.89– 41.10	65.81– 66.14	OR 99 (6th & 7th Streets / Rogue River Highway) – City Center, Rogue River	Redwood Spur Highway No. 482 begins
Oregon	Josephine	Grants Pass	40.94	65.89	OR 238 (Williams Highway) – Murphy, Jacksonville	
Oregon	Josephine	Grants Pass	43.57	70.12	I-5 – Portland, Medford	Northern terminus; I-5 exit 58; interchange
1.000 mi = 1.609 km; 1.000 km = 0.621 mi: Incomplete access; Route transition

== See also ==
- Avenue of the Giants
- Generals Highway
