= O'Brien, Oregon =

Unincorporated community in the state of Oregon, United States

- Census-designated place
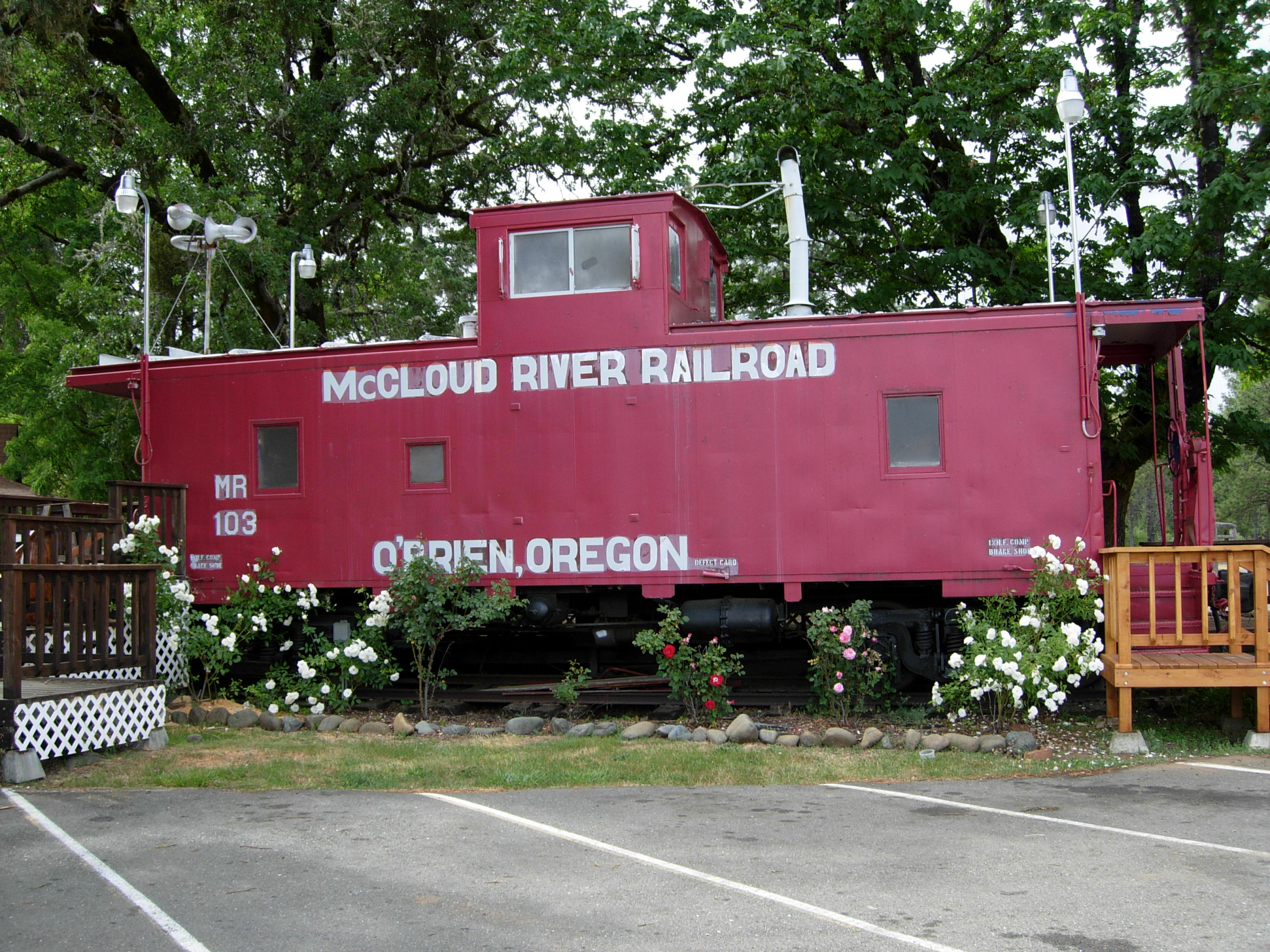

- Location within Oregon Location within the United States
- Coordinates: 42°4′8″N 123°43′15″W
- Country: United States
- State: Oregon
- County: Josephine

Area
  - Total: 5.24 sq mi (13.56 km^{2})
  - Land: 5.22 sq mi (13.52 km^{2})
  - Water: 0.015 sq mi (0.04 km^{2})
- Elevation: 1,415 ft (431 m)

Population (2020)
  - Total: 470
  - Density: 90.0/sq mi (34.75/km^{2})
- Time zone: UTC-8 (Pacific (PST))
  - Summer (DST): UTC-7 (PDT)
- ZIP code: 97534
- Area codes: 458 and 541
- FIPS code: 41-54350
- GNIS feature ID: 1147100

O'Brien is an unincorporated community and census-designated place (CDP) in Josephine County, Oregon, United States. As of the 2020 census, O'Brien had a population of 470. The unemployment rate is 6.9%, slightly higher than the national average of 5.2% The community was named after John O'Brien, who was one of the first settlers to arrive at the locality. In 2012, a small group started protecting the town when the police were cut due to budget cuts.

== Infrastructure ==
The town consists of a few businesses at the intersection of Redwood Highway and Lone Mountain Road. These include a post office with the zip code 97534, and a fire station. It is the southernmost town in Josephine county. To the east of O'Brien is the ghost town of Waldo, then further east is the unincorporated town of Takilma. To the north of O'Brien is the Illinois Valley's only city, Cave Junction, and further north are the towns of Kerby and Selma. To the northeast is the unincorporated Holland.

== Geography ==
O'Brien is in southwestern Josephine County in the valley of the West Fork of the Illinois River, a north-flowing tributary of the Rogue River. U.S. Route 199 passes through the community, leading north 7 miles (11 km) to Cave Junction and 36 miles (58 km) to Grants Pass, and south 5 miles (8 km) to the California state line and 45 miles (72 km) to Crescent City, California.

According to the U.S. Census Bureau, the O'Brien CDP has a total area of 5.23 square miles (13.54 km^{2}), of which 0.02 square miles (0.04 km^{2}), or 0.26%, are water.

== Demographics ==
Historical population
Census	Pop.	Note	%±
2020	470		—
U.S. Decennial Census

== Climate ==
O'Brien has a climate that is a Mediterranean (CSA) in nature with hot and dry summer days and cool and wet winters. It is also subtropical in nature due to its hot summer days, some of the hottest in Oregon, with temps often topping 95 °F (35 °C). Summer lows are very low in comparison to its highs.

Climate data for O'Brien, Oregon
Month	Jan	Feb	Mar	Apr	May	Jun	Jul	Aug	Sep	Oct	Nov	Dec	Year
Record high °F (°C)	66 (19)	76 (24)	82 (28)	92 (33)	99 (37)	109 (43)	112 (44)	110 (43)	110 (43)	100 (38)	78 (26)	69 (21)	112 (44)
Mean daily maximum °F (°C)	51 (11)	57 (14)	62 (17)	68 (20)	77 (25)	85 (29)	94 (34)	94 (34)	88 (31)	74 (23)	57 (14)	50 (10)	71 (22)
Mean daily minimum °F (°C)	33 (1)	34 (1)	35 (2)	37 (3)	42 (6)	47 (8)	52 (11)	50 (10)	45 (7)	39 (4)	37 (3)	33 (1)	40 (4)
Record low °F (°C)	11 (−12)	4 (−16)	20 (−7)	21 (−6)	27 (−3)	28 (−2)	36 (2)	34 (1)	25 (−4)	15 (−9)	11 (−12)	−6 (−21)	−6 (−21)
Average precipitation inches (mm)	10.77 (274)	9.34 (237)	7.86 (200)	4.28 (109)	2.42 (61)	0.94 (24)	0.28 (7.1)	0.39 (9.9)	0.80 (20)	3.53 (90)	9.59 (244)	13.00 (330)	63.20 (1,605)
Average snowfall inches (cm)	4.1 (10)	2.5 (6.4)	1.4 (3.6)	0.8 (2.0)	0 (0)	0 (0)	0 (0)	0 (0)	0 (0)	0 (0)	0.4 (1.0)	2.5 (6.4)	11.7 (30)
Source 1:
Source 2:
