= List of private-use airports in Oregon =

List of private-use airports in Oregon (U.S. state), sorted by location.

This page only lists private-use airports. For public-use and military airports, see list of airports in Oregon.

Airports in bold are of unknown status.

== List ==
Descriptions of each column can be found below in the Notes section.

City	FAA	IATA	Airport name
Adams	OR18		Davis Heliport
Adams	OG04		Rothrock Field Airport
Adel	47OR		MC Ranch Airport
Albany	OR20		Hemmingson Airport
Albany	4OR3		Lambert Field Airport
Albany	OR21		Miller Airstrip
Albany	OR19		Propst Airport
Albany	OR22		Roppair Airport
Albany	9OR8		Wooldridge Agstrip
Alfalfa	50OR		Goering Ranches Airport
Amity	64OR		Plum Valley Airport
Amity	OG44		Watts Landing Airport
Andrews	OG53		Wildhorse Valley Airport
Antelope	2OR1		Big Muddy Ranch Airport
Ashland	65OR		Timberland Shop Heliport
Astoria	OG03		Columbia Memorial Hospital Heliport
Astoria	OR23		Karpens Airport
Astoria	OG56		Station Thirty Heliport
Athena	OR24		Barrett Field Airport
Aumsville	OR25		Flying E Airport
Aurora	OR71		Columbia Aviation Heliport
Aurora	OR68		Columbia Helicopters Heliport
Baker City	93OR		St. Elizabeth Hospital Heliport
Baker City	OG45		Bald Mountain Airport
Baker City	OG47		Three Valleys Ranch Heliport
Banks	OR27		Chadwick Airport
Banks	OG02		Rieben Airport
Beatty	87OR		Moondance Ranch Airport
Beaverton	86OR		Amber Glen Business Center Heliport
Beaverton	24OR		Beaverton Corporate Center Heliport
Beaverton	OR00		**Flying K Ranch Airport**
Beaverton	OR28		Harvey's Acres Airport
Beaverton	53OR		St. Vincent Hospital Heliport
Beaverton	OR03		Turel Heliport
Bend	OR30		D M Stevenson Ranch Airport
Bend	OR29		Gopher Gulch Airport
Bend	OR15		Horseman Heliport
Bend	43OR		Inspiration Airport
Bend	5OR5		Juniper Air Park
Bend	OR04		Kennel Airstrip
Bend	8OR5		Pilot Butte Airport
Bend	54OR		St. Charles Medical Center Heliport
Bend	OG05		Sundance Meadows Airport
Bly	85OR		Allen's Airstrip
Bly	80OR		Wilderness Airport
Boardman	OR32		Simtag Farms Airport
Boring	OR35		Flying K Bar J Ranch Airport
Boring	OR72		Krueger Airport
Boring	6OR7		Schmidt Airport
Brookings	OR36		Garvins Heliport
Brooks	OR38		Harchenko Industrial Airport
Brooks	7OR7		Hollin Airport
Brooks	29OR		Smith Private Airport
Brownlee Village	OR75		Brownlee Heliport
Brownsville	3OR1		Cubehole Airport
Brownsville	9OR0		Lafferty Field
Brownsville	OR94		Showa Airport
Burns	81OR		Wagontire Airport
Buxton	OR61		Apple Valley Airport
Canby	44OR		Compton Airport
Canby	OR40		Dietz Airpark
Canby	OR41		Workman Airpark
Central Point	OG58		Erickson Air-Crane Admin Offices Heliport
Christmas Valley	OG06		Table Rock Airport
Coburg	OR44		Briggs Airport
Coburg	OG48		Greer Airport
Coburg	16OR		Pape' Bros. Inc. Heliport
Coburg	OR45		West Point Airport
Condon	OR46		Ajax Airport
Condon	OR48		Snyder Ranch Airport
Coos Bay	OR49		Bay Area Hospital Heliport
Coquille	45OR		Benham Airport
Corbett	OR50		Lehman Field
Corvallis	OG49		Coca Cola Airport
Corvallis	OG01		Dunning Vineyards Airport
Corvallis	OR39		Flying Tom Airport
Corvallis	OR55		Good Samaritan Hospital Heliport
Corvallis	OR56		Holiday Airport
Corvallis	8OR7		Joyner Airport
Corvallis	55OR		Muddy Creek Airport
Corvallis	4OR4		Schrock Airport
Corvallis	OR52		Venell Airport
Corvallis	OR54		Winn Airport
Cove	OG07		Cove Side Ranch Port Airport
Cove	7OR0		Minam Lodge Airport
Crane	7OR1		Arnold Airstrip
Crescent Lake Junction	OR33		Crescent-Odell Lakes RFPD Heliport
Creswell	OR58		Mazama Timber Pad
Creswell	OR57		Walker Airport
Crowley	78OR		Crowley Ranch Airstrip
Culver	OG00		3 Rivers Recreation Area Airport
Days Creek	8OR3		Riverview Ranch Airport
Dayville	49OR		Land's Inn Ranch Airport
Dexter	82OR		Lost Creek Airport
Diamond	OR08		Barton Lake Ranch Airport
Dillard	66OR		Winston-Dillard Fire District Station Number 2 Heliport
Donald	67OR		McGee Airport
Dufur	OR60		Fargher Airport
Dufur	68OR		Lyda Ranch Airstrip
Eagle Point	0OR5		East Oregon Cattle Company Airport
Eagle Point	8OR8		Light Valley Tree Farm Heliport
Eagle Point	89OR		Mucky Flat Airport
Echo	OL02		West Buttercreek Airport
Elkton	94OR		Farm Yard Field
Elmira	33OR		Crow-Mag Airport
Enterprise	OR64		Beach Ranch Airport
Enterprise	05OR		Peacock Ranch Airport
Enterprise	6OR9		Reds Wallowa Horse Ranch Airport
Estacada	OR66		Beaver Oaks Airport
Estacada	OR65		Eagle Nest Ranch Airport
Estacada	OR67		McGill Airport
Eugene	31OR		Heli-Jet Heliport
Eugene	OG32		Mahlon Sweet Field Heliport
Eugene	OR69		Sacred Heart Medical Center Heliport
Fields	OR09		Whitehorse Ranch Airport
Florence	4OR9		Peace Harbor Hospital Heliport
Florence	OG57		Pier 126 Heliport
Forest Grove	06OR		Hayden Mountain Airport
Frenchglen	OR10		Roaring Springs Ranch Airport
Gaston	69OR		Dick Fisher Airport
Gaston	70OR		Goodin Creek Airport
Glendale	OR73		Calvert Peak STOLport
Glendale	OG41		Nace Family Airstrip
Glide	17OR		Glide Aero Airport
Glide	98TE		Hilltop Airport
Grants Pass	OR92		Billiebob Ultralight Flightpark
Grants Pass	OR88		Jantzer Airport
Grants Pass	8OR4		Southern Oregon General Hospital Heliport
Grants Pass	OR74		Winkle Bar Airport
Gresham	56OR		Mount Hood Medical Center Heliport
Haines	OR11		Jensens Strip
Haines	OG27		Muddy Creek Airport
Halfway	OR70		Pine Valley Airport
Halsey	OG16		Jim's Airstrip
Halsey	OR76		Waynes Air Service Airport
Happy Valley	26OR		Cub Port Airport
Happy Valley	OL03		Happy Valley Airport
Harper	OG50		Cottonwood Creek Ranch Airport
Harrisburg	OR78		Daniels Field
Harrisburg	OR79		Knox's Private Airstrip
Hermiston	OG09		Good Shepherd Hospital Heliport
Hillsboro	8OR0		Danielson Heliport
Hillsboro	OR81		Olinger Strip
Hillsboro	OG46		Tuality Hospital Heliport
Homestead	OR91		Big Bar Heliport
Homestead	OR12		Oxbow Airport
Hood River	7OR6		Green Acres Air Park
Hood River	OR43		Hood River Fire Dept. Heliport
Hood River	OR82		United Telephone System Heliport
Hood River	14OR		Air Columbia Heliport
Independence	OR77		Faust Field
Independence	OR85		Wigrich Airport
Ironside	2OR6		Lockhart Airport
Jefferson	2OR3		Davidson Field
Jefferson	OR86		Gilmour Ag Air Airport
Jordan Valley	12OR		Skinner Ranch Airport
Junction City	OG36		Munson Airport
Junction City	OR47		Strauch Field
Juntura	OR14		Juntura Airport
Juntura	3OR9		Murphy Ranch Airport
Kent	OL04		Decker Ranch Airport
Kimberly	OG39		Longview Ranch Airport
Kinzua	OR89		Kinzua Airport
Klamath Falls	9OR3		Merle West Medical Center Heliport
La Grande	3OR2		Maxwell Private Airport
La Pine	OR84		La Pine Heliport
Lafayette	OR90		Lafayette Airstrip
Lake Oswego	2OG3		Wiley's Seaplane Port
Lakeview	OR26		Farr Airport
Lakeview	90OR		Lake District Hospital Heliport
Lakeview	OG17		Teed's Airport
Lakeview	22OG		Withrotor Airport
Lawen	OG18		Lawen Strip
Lebanon	8OR1		Lebanon Hospital Heliport
Lebanon	OG10		Mt. Hope Airport
Lebanon	88OR		Tallman Airport
Lincoln City	OR93		North Lincoln Hospital Heliport
Long Creek	OR07		Miranda's Skyranch Airport
Lostine	83OR		Tamarack Springs Ranch Airport
Madras	OG19		Bombay Farms Airport
Madras	OG35		Mountain View Hospital Heliport
Madras	72OR		Ochs Private Airport
Madras	OG51		Six Springs Ranch Airport
Maupin	19OR		Nelson Ranch Airport
McCoy	OR95		Vineyard Airport
McMinnville	OG38		Valley Medical Center Heliport
Medford	OR96		Beagle Sky Ranch Airport
Medford	OR97		Burrill Airport
Medford	0OR0		Providence Hospital Heliport
Medford	OR99		Rogue Valley Medical Center Heliport
Medford	OR06		Snider Creek Airport
Mehama	7OR2		Basl Hill Farms Airport
Merlin	0OR2		Hendershots Heliport
Merrill	0OR3		Long Ranch Airport
Metolius	0OR4		Round Butte Heliport
Milton-Freewater	9OR4		King's Airport
Milton-Freewater	OG33		Oregon Sky Ranch Airport
Milwaukie	07OR		Bruce's Airport
Mitchell	04OR		Collins Landing Strip
Molalla	5OR1		Helitradewinds Heliport
Molalla	OL05		Skydive Oregon Airport
Monmouth	OG52		JPM Airport
Monmouth	0OR7		Marr Field
Mount Hood	0OR9		Hanel Field
Mountaindale	63OR		Mountaindale Airport
Myrtle Creek	OG62		Myrtle Creek Municipal Heliport
Newberg	1OR1		Chehalem Mountain Heliport
Newberg	OR31		Newberg Community Hospital Heliport
Newberg	28OR		Parrett Mountain Airport
Newberg	OG55		Providence Newberg Medical Center Heliport
Newberg	73OR		Ribbon Ridge Airport
Newberg	74OR		Stan Jost Airport
Newport	8OR9		Pacific Communities Hospital Heliport
Newport	27OR		Time Flies Private Heliport
North Bend	1OR2		Menasha Pad
North Bend	1OR0		Sunnyhill Airport
North Plains	1OR4		North Plains Gliderport
North Plains	1OR3		Sunset Air Strip
North Powder	OR16		Umpleby Ranch Airport
Norway	OR42		Norway Airport
Nyssa	75OR		Malheur Memorial Hospital Heliport
Oakland	2OR4		Heavens Gate Ranch Airport
Oakland	60OR		Whitaker Airport
Oakridge	13OR		Aubrey Mountain Airstrip
Olex	1OR5		Reed Airport
Ontario	5OR6		Holy Rosary Medical Center Heliport
Oregon City	OG30		Aeroacres Airport
Oregon City	7OR9		Bonney Acres Airport
Oregon City	1OR8		Clackamas County Redsoils Heliport
Oregon City	OG20		Fairways Airport
Oregon City	2OR0		Nielsen Airport
Oregon City	1OR7		Skyhill Airport
Oregon City	1OR9		Willamette Falls Community Hospital Heliport
Oxbow Village	OR83		Oxbow Heliport
Pendleton	46OR		Delamarter Heliport
Pendleton	OG42		Quail Field
Pendleton	40OR		St. Anthony's Hospital Heliport
Portland	3OR4		Babler Bros. Inc. Heliport
Portland	7OR5		Emanuel Hospital Heliport
Portland	3OR3		Hessel Tractor Heliport
Portland	21OR		KATU Heliport
Portland	9OR6		Oregon Health & Science University Emergency Heliport
Portland	3OR0		PGE Service Center Heliport
Portland	9OR5		Portland Adventist Medical Center Heliport
Portland	34OR		Providence Medical Center Heliport
Portland	OG11		Rose Garden Heliport
Portland	9OR9		Wallace Heliport
Portland	76OR		Westwood Corporation Heliport
Portland	2OR5		Woodland Park Hospital Heliport
Portland	2OR9		World Trade Center Heliport
Post	42OR		Shotgun Ranch Airstrip
Prairie City	97OR		Hi Country No. 2 Airport
Prairie City	OR17		Oxbow Ranch Airport
Prineville	77OR		BLM Heliport
Prineville	OG21		Dry Creek Airpark
Prineville	2OR2		Pioneer Memorial Hospital Heliport
Prineville	OG12		Wilson Ranch Airport
Progress	3OR6		Western Div. Service Center Heliport
Rainier	OR62		Rainier Heliport
Rainier	3OR7		Trojan Heliport
Redland	20OR		Warner's Airport
Redmond	62OR		Cinder Butte Heliport
Redmond	3OR8		Cline Falls Air Park
Redmond	OR02		River Run Ranch Airport
Reedsport	79OR		Cruse Memorial Heliport
Rogue River	4OR0		Springbrook Airport
Rome	0OR6		Rome Service Airport
Roseburg	OR01		Douglas Community Hospital Heliport
Roseburg	95OR		Flournoy Valley Airport
Roseburg	48OR		Lookingglass Airport
Roseburg	OG22		Mercy Hospital Heliport
Roseburg	OG40		Napier Ranch Airport
Roseburg	58OR		Umpqua Airport
Ruch	OG13		Fly By Night Airport
Salem	3OR5		Elkins Heliport
Salem	4OR5		Fly 'N' W Airport
Salem	4OR7		Lusardi Field
Salem	51OR		PGE Heliport
Salem	9OR2		Reforestation Services Heliport
Salem	OG37		Salem Hospital Heliport
Salem	4OR2		South Hill Heliport
Salem	00OR		Steel Systems Heliport
Salem	4OR8		Wagoner Airport
Sandy	4OR6		Auberge Des Fleurs Airport
Sandy	OG29		McKinnon Airpark
Scappoose	52OR		Chinook Ultralight Airpark
Scappoose	8OR6		Grabhorn's Airport
Scio	OR51		Gillette Field Airport
Scio	OG28		The Green Trees Ranch Airport
Seaside	OR63		Seaside Heliport
Selma	84OR		B Bar Ranch Airport
Selma	5OR0		Backachers Ranch Airport
Seneca	7OR8		Inshallah International Airport
Seneca	OG14		Silvies Valley Ranch Airport
Seneca	OR98		Seneca Emergency Airstrip
Shady Cove	OG31		Shady Cove Airpark
Shaniko	OG54		Shaniko Cattle Airport
Shaniko	9OR1		Shaniko Ranch Airport
Sheridan	91OR		Abba's Airport
Sheridan	5OR2		Bushnell Airport
Sheridan	98OR		Mach-O Acres Airport
Sheridan	OG23		Poverty Hollow Airport
Siletz	5OR3		Siletz Airport
Silver Lake	1JY2		Mahogany Mountain Airport
Silver Lake	01OR		Red & White Flying Service Airport
Silver Lake	08OR		Saxon Sycan Airport
Silverton	22OR		Iron Crown Airport
Sisters	7OR4		Pineridge Ranch Airport
Sisters	OG15		Sage Ranch Airport
Sisters	61OR		The Citadel Airport
Sisters	OR34		Whippet Field
Sprague River	5OR4		Flying T Ranch Airport
Springfield	41OR		Mc Will Hospital Heliport (McKenzie-Willamette Medical Center)
Springfield	23OR		Saxon's Heliport
Springfield/Jasper	36OR		Jasper Ridge Airstrip
Starkey	37OR		Vey Sheep Ranch Airport
Stayton	5OR8		Hatch Airport
Stayton	8OR2		Kingston Airpark
Stayton	5OR9		Lone Oaks Ranch Airport
Stayton	5OR7		Santiam Memorial Hospital Helistop
Sutherlin	OG24		Flying D Ranch Airport
Sutherlin	11OR		Holiday Sky Ranch Airport
Sutherlin	57OR		Umpqua River Farm Airport
Tangent	6OR0		Grells Airport
The Dalles	6OR2		Chenoweth Airpark
The Dalles	7OR3		Honald Ranch Airport
The Dalles	OG43		Mid-Columbia Fire & Rescue Heliport
The Dalles	09OR		Mid-Columbia Medical Center Heliport
The Dalles	6OR1		Pointers Airport
The Dalles	02OR		Rowena Dell Airport
Tigard	OR37		Lincoln Tower Heliport
Tigard	OG34		Meyer Riverside Airpark
Tillamook	6OR3		Tillamook County General Hospital Heliport
Troy	03OR		Powwatka Ridge Airport
Tualatin	6OR5		Meridian Park Hospital Heliport
Ukiah	96OR		Cable Creek Ranch Airport
Umatilla	59OR		McNary Dam Heliport
Unity	11OG		Unity Airport
Vernonia	30OR		Bero Field
Vernonia	10OR		Stevens Mountain Airport
Wallowa	99OR		Smith Mountain Ranch Airport
Wamic	32OR		Pine Hollow Airport
Wapinitia	OR53		Wapinitia Airport
West Linn	92OR		Pynn Heliport
White City	39OR		Croman Heliport
White City	OG25		Firefly Ranch Airfield
White City	0OR8		Sutton On Rogue Airport
Willamina	OG26		Roscoes Airport
Wonder	6OR6		Wonder Airport
Yamhill	OR05		Flying M Airport
Yamhill	OR59		Trivelpiece Airport
			**Closed private-use airports**
Hillsboro	~~OR80~~		Teufel's Farm Strip (closed)
Kent	~~OR87~~		Compressor Station Number 10 STOLport (closed)
Sweet Home	~~2OR7~~		Sweet Home Airport (closed)

== Notes ==
- **CITY** is the city generally associated with the airport.
- **FAA** is the FAA Location Identifier.
- **IATA** is the IATA airport code.
- **AIRPORT** is the official airport name.

== See also ==
- List of airports in Oregon
- Lists of Oregon-related topics
