= Lost Creek Airport =

Lost Creek Airport may refer to the following airports in the United States:

- Lost Creek Airport (Michigan) (FAA: 5Y4) in Luzerne, Michigan
- Lost Creek Airport (FAA: 82OR) in Dexter, Oregon, a private-use airport in Oregon
