= California State Route 197 =

Highway in California

State Route 197
- North Bank Road
- Map of Del Norte County in northwestern California with SR 197 highlighted in red

Route information
- Maintained by Caltrans
- Length: 6.725 mi (10.823 km)

Major junctions
- South end: US 199 near Hiouchi
- North end: US 101 near Fort Dick

Location
- Country: United States
- State: California
- Counties: Del Norte

Highway system
- State highways in California; Interstate; US; State; Scenic; History; Pre‑1964; Unconstructed; Deleted; Freeways
← SR 195	→ SR 198

State Route 197 (SR 197) is a state highway in the U.S. state of California located north of Crescent City in Del Norte County. Running along the north bank of the Smith River as North Bank Road, SR 197 is a bypass connecting U.S. Highways 199 and 101.

== Route description ==
Route 197 is defined in section 497 of the California Streets and Highways Code, and that the highway is "from Route 199 to Route 101 staying north of the Smith River".

SR 197 begins with an intersection at U.S. Route 199 in Jedediah Smith Redwoods State Park. Moving northward, the road quickly exits the park, roughly paralleling the Smith River located to the west side of the road. The road then follows the river northward and then northwestward with several local roads meeting SR 197 along the evergreen forest area. The road meets its northern terminus at U.S. Route 101 just south of the Oregon border.

SR 197 is not part of the National Highway System, a network of highways that are considered essential to the country's economy, defense, and mobility by the Federal Highway Administration.

== Major intersections ==
Except where prefixed with a letter, postmiles were measured on the road as it was in 1964, based on the alignment that existed at the time, and do not necessarily reflect current mileage. Postmile prefixes include: R reflecting a realignment in the route since then, M indicating a second realignment, L referring to an overlap due to a correction or change, and T indicating postmiles classified as temporary. Segments that remain unconstructed or have been relinquished to local control may be omitted. The entire route is in Del Norte County.

Location	Postmile	Destinations	Notes
	R0.00	US 199 – Crescent City, Gasquet, Grants Pass	South end of SR 197
	7.08	US 101 – Crescent City, Oregon	North end of SR 197
1.000 mi = 1.609 km; 1.000 km = 0.621 mi
