= Wonder, Oregon =

Unincorporated community in the state of Oregon, United States

Coordinates: 42.364281°N 123.535621°W

Wonder is an unincorporated community in Josephine County, Oregon, United States, on U.S. Route 199 about 13 miles west of Grants Pass and 8 miles east of Selma. It is within the Rogue River – Siskiyou National Forest.

The town apparently got its name in 1902 after John T. Roberson opened a general store two miles south of Wilderville, and residents wondered how he would get enough business to make a living as the area did not have many settlers. Roberson began to call his store "Wonder Store". Wonder post office was established in 1903 and Roberson was the first postmaster. In 1915 Wonder had a population of 25, and a school that was also used as a church. As of 1916 there was a Wonder station on the California and Oregon Coast Railroad line here. Sometime in the 1920s, the community moved two miles further west up Slate Creek. The post office closed in 1959.
