= List of killings by law enforcement officers in the United States, May 2015 =

This is a list of people reported killed by non-military law enforcement officers in the United States in May 2015, whether in the line of duty or not, and regardless of reason or method. The listing documents the occurrence of a death, making no implications regarding wrongdoing or justification on the part of the person killed or officer involved. Killings are arranged by date of the incident that caused death. Different death dates, if known, are noted in the description. The table below lists 88 people.

== May 2015 ==
Date	Name (Age) of Deceased	Race	State (City)	Description
2015-05-31	Davis, Richard Gregory (50)	Black	New York (Rochester)	Died after being tasered.
2015-05-31	Bushey, James (47)	White	Texas (Palestine)	After a reported robbery at a Walmart, Bushey ran away and hid in the bathroom of a nearby Applebees. After officers detained him without handcuffs, he broke free, showed a BB gun, and was fatally shot by officers.
2015-05-31	Pitts, Jeffrey Scott (36)		Georgia (Conyers)	Pitts shot and killed a clerk and a customer at a liquor store and shot and injured two more at his parents home nearby. When deputies arrived, Pitts started shooting at them with a high-powered assault rifle. Officers shot back and killed Pitts.
2015-05-31	Morris, James (40)	White	Oregon (Medford)	Morris was upset by a breakup with his partner and she called 911 reporting that he was armed and suicidal. Responding officers from the Medford Police Department found him nearby. An officer tried to talk to him but Morris walked toward the officer and pointed his gun. Morris was killed in the exchange of gunfire that followed.
2015-05-31	Jordan, Curtis (45)		Alabama (Huntsville)	Huntsville Police responded to a domestic disturbance call from the wife about her husband who threatened to set their house on fire. The man threw hot coals on the responding officer and a struggle ensued. The man, Curtis Jordan, became unresponsive and died about a week later in a hospital.
2015-05-30	Rivera, Alexander Tirado (39)	Hispanic	Tennessee (Nashville)	A suspect tried to rob an Easy Cash Solutions loan business. When police arrived, he took a 21-year-old female employee hostage (on her first day) and brought her outside with an air pistol to her head. At some point, she began fighting with the suspect to try to get away, and when she was about a foot away, Sergeant Scott Carter fatally shot the suspect. Nobody else was injured.
2015-05-30	Box, Robert (55)	White	Oregon (Wilderville)	When Oregon State Police responded to a 911 call of domestic violence they encountered Box in the driveway carrying a handgun. Moments later they shot him. He was pronounced dead at a nearby medical facility.
2015-05-30	Proctor, Ebin Lamont (18)	White	Arizona (Cottonwood)	Proctor was among six people in a car stopped about 4:00 a.m. by Deputy Steven Gorman of the Yavapai County Sheriff's Office, Proctor fled on foot and Deputy Gorman pursued him. When Deputy Gorman used his taser, Proctor attacked the deputy. While the two fought Gorman shot and killed Proctor. It was later revealed that Proctor, who was in violation of his felony probation, had used alcohol, marijuana, and methamphetamine.
2015-05-29	Fischer, Nehemiah (35)	White	Oklahoma (Okmulgee County)	Troopers responded to a report of a stranded vehicle and found two men trying to remove a vehicle from a roadway which was experiencing a flash flood. Troopers tried to rescue the men, who were upset about having to leave the vehicle. After the men reached the troopers, there was an altercation and Fischer was fatally shot. He was armed at the time. The other man, his older brother Brandon, was arrested for assault and public intoxication.
2015-05-29	Collins, Billy J. (56)	White	Kentucky (Louisa)	Collins was arrested for driving on a suspended license, lack of insurance, and disorderly conduct. At the Louisa Police Department refused to comply with commands, was struck several times, and then barricaded himself in a foyer. Officers gained access to the room and tased Collins multiple times and beat him. After he was restrained he "showed signs of a medical emergency." He was taken to a hospital where he died.
2015-05-29	Allen, Kevin (36)	Black	New Jersey (Lyndhurst)	Allen was wanted for contempt of court when a local law enforcement officer spotted him outside a public library and attempted to engage him there. After moving inside the library and up to its top floor, he allegedly "menaced" and charged police with a large knife in a public library. Officers then fatally shot him.
2015-05-28	Dothard, Kenneth Joel (40)	Black	Georgia (Carrollton)	Cpl. Chad Cook responded to a report of a suspicious person with a gun near an ATM. The officer questioned the man who first claimed to have a permit for his holstered weapon, then said he didn't know he needed one, then indicated he knew he shouldn't have the weapon because of felonies on his record. After Cook called for backup, Dothard became agitated. The officer warned him to not touch the gun or take it out, or the officer would shoot. Dothard allegedly tried to take the gun out, claiming that he had authority because he had been in the military. At that time Dothard was fatally shot multiple times. Audio, but not video, was promptly released at the reference link.
2015-05-28	Baker, Kyle (18)	White	Michigan (Trenton)	Police responded to reports of a highly agitated young man at home. Baker attacked officers with a lawn mower blade and was fatally shot. He died about 12 hours later, early the next morning. The officer was treated for a cut hand and released.
2015-05-28	Strong, James Edward (32)	Black	Colorado (Brighton)	A SWAT team was serving a narcotics warrant when Strong allegedly opened fire. Officers fired back and hit Strong multiple times, killing him.
2015-05-28	Morgan, Darrell (60)	White	South Carolina (Lancaster)	Recently separated Morgan followed his estranged wife into a store and the two talked. When he pulled out a handgun, deputies from Lancaster County Sheriff's Office were called. Deputies say they shot after Morgan pointed the weapon at them. He died at a hospital. Darrell Morgan had been Pastor of New Harvest Freewill Baptist Church in Tradesville.
2015-05-28	McAllister, Scott (39)	White	New Jersey (Middletown)	McAllister was drunk and armed with a knife and had taken his 17-month old son hostage with threats to harm him, after a fight with the boy's mother. The mother ran outside and called 911. A SWAT team surrounded the house and after five hours of failed negotiations to get the father to give up the child, the team moved in around 4:30am and shot McAllister twice, killing him. The child was uninjured.
2015-05-27	Hubble, Simon D. (33)	White	California (Alpine)	A San Diego County Sheriff's deputy was called with a report of a mentally disturbed and violent man. When the deputy arrived, the man was no longer at the residence, but someone at the house said that he planned to provoke officers to shoot him. He was reportedly armed with a screwdriver. Soon the deputy encountered the man in the street. As the confrontation developed, the deputy used his taser, and then shot Hubble, who died at the scene.
2015-05-27	Morad, Feras (20)	Asian	California (Long Beach)	The unarmed college student, who may have been under the influence of drugs for the first time, started acting erratically and allegedly violently. He jumped through a glass second-story window and was hurt; friends called police for help. The responding officer attempted to restrain him using verbal commands, an electronic control device, an impact weapon, and physical force, but the officer said Morad kept walking toward the officer and at one point said he was going to attack. At that point the officer fatally shot Morad, even though (a witness claims) Morad was walking away at the time. Morad's family was not notified.
2015-05-27	Sandeno, Garrett Roderick (24)	White	Oklahoma (Edmond)	When Garrett Sandeno's wife told him she wanted a divorce he became suicidal so she called police for help. Edmond Police officers found him on a street near his home, carrying a pistol. Police ordered him to drop the weapon but instead, officers say, he pointed it at them. An officer fired at Sandeno, striking him in the chest. The weapon was a pellet gun.
2015-05-27	Torrence, Randall C. (34)	White	Kansas (Kansas City)	When Torrence began running around and dancing in a parking lot, witnesses reported to police. Kansas City Police and paramedics arrived and when the paramedics tried to load him into their vehicle Torrence began striking and kicking people. Police used their stun guns twice as they put him into handcuffs. He went into cardiac arrest and was pronounced dead at a hospital.
2015-05-27	Davis, Harry (57)	White	Georgia (Eatonton)	Davis and his son were drunk and arguing in their car, which caused a passenger to call for help. Putnam County Sheriff's deputies responded. Deputies pulled the car over and separated the father and son. Harry Davis threw a knife at a deputy and then returned to his car and got a larger knife. David refused orders to drop the weapon and Deputy Justin Brock shot and killed him.
2015-05-26	Williams, Jessie Nicholas (24)	White	Louisiana (Bossier City)	Williams was wanted for kidnapping his 9-year-old niece and taking her across state lines. She was found safe in a motel with Williams, who was killed in a struggle with the authorities. An FBI task force member was shot in the leg during the struggle, but was expected to recover, and reports were not clear if Williams had a weapon.
2015-05-26	Tallant III, Millard J. (62)	White	Washington (Monroe)	A deputy was called to investigate suspicious activity. The deputy found the suspect walking along the roadway, with his car in a ditch. The deputy called for backup. By the time backup arrived, the deputy, who was uninjured, had shot the man dead. The cause and manner of death are pending investigation.
2015-05-26	Branch, Dalton (51)	Black	New York (Brooklyn)	Branch was wanted for fatally shooting a 55-year-old ex-girlfriend earlier that morning in a casino parking lot, then sending taunting messages to the woman's friend and family. Plainclothes officers found the rented car Branch had used and approached, but he opened fire. The plainclothes officers fired back at least 20 times, several of which struck and killed him.
2015-05-25	Bolin, Cassandra Caye (31)	White	Texas (Austin)	Austin Police officers responded to a 1:30 a.m. call from her boyfriend that Bolin was suicidal. SWAT was called out to negotiate with Bolin. After several hours she came out with a pistol, and when she pointed it at the officers a SWAT sniper shot and killed her.
2015-05-25	Briggs, Anthony Dewayne (36)	Black	Alabama (Huntsville)	Briggs got into a fight with his brother and a neighbor, swinging a knife at and cutting both of them. He allegedly charged at responding officers with a knife, refused to put down the weapon, and was fatally shot by officers. The other two men were treated and released from a hospital.
2015-05-24	Walker, Coy Wayne (41)		Texas (Weatherford)	Parker County Sheriff deputies responded to a domestic disturbance call from a mother about her adult son. The family says it was a medical call because the son had heat stroke. When the deputies arrived they say Walker was combative. During the deputies' struggle to arrest and restrain Walker, he became unresponsive. Deputies called for an ambulance and he was transported to a medical center where he was pronounced dead. The Tarrant County Medical Examiner found methamphetamine in Walker's system, and the cause of death was "undetermined."
2015-05-23	Robinson, Eric (40)	White	Arizona (Eagar)	A suspect allegedly shot a woman in the shoulder at a Church of Jesus Christ of Latter-day Saints Stake Center from his pickup truck, and then fired at responding officers. One was hit but promptly treated and released. Officers pursued the suspect for several blocks until he ran inside a home, then ran out toward a deputy still armed. Officers fatally shot him.
2015-05-23	Horn, James Jr. (47)	White	Missouri (Knob Noster)	Horn allegedly kept Sandra Sutton in a box in his home for four months. After she escaped and informed police, they began searching for Horn. Sutton and her 17-year-old son were then killed, with Horn as the sole suspect, and the search intensified. After 23 days of searching, Horn was found, armed and threatening police, refusing to surrender, and was shot dead.
2015-05-23	Jackson, Caso (25)	Black	Michigan (Detroit)	Jackson was holding his estranged wife and his child hostage in the woman's home. A Detroit Police special response unit was called to negotiate. It seemed Caso was going to surrender, but he came out with his shotgun and fired at the officers. Caso was killed by the officers. One officer was struck by a shotgun pellet but was expected to recover. According to Mrs. Jackson her husband had been threatening to kill himself.
2015-05-22	Lowery, Michael (40)	White	Pennsylvania (Somerset)	Lowery broke into a Save-A-Lot store at 3:30 AM, tripping a burglar alarm while prying open the back door. Responding officers found Lowery (who had three active felony warrants), armed, and he ignored commands to drop the weapon, instead raising it. Officers then shot him dead. An investigation showed this to be a BB gun modified to look like a real handgun.
2015-05-21	Washington, Javoris (29)	Black	Florida (Fort Lauderdale)	After a domestic dispute, Washington barricaded himself in a house, taking his girlfriend hostage. SWAT teams surrounding the house tried to negotiate but after tense discussions opened fire and killed Washington.
2015-05-21	Caldwell, Jerome Thomas (32)	Black	South Carolina (Charleston)	Caldwell was suspected of an ambush shooting of a deputy sheriff (who was alive in critical but stable condition at the time). Officers attempted to serve an arrest warrant, resulting in a 10-hour standoff at an apartment building. Caldwell then ran, firing at police who returned fire, fatally shooting Caldwell.
2015-05-21	Diaz, Elvin (24)	Hispanic	New Jersey (Hackensack)	Three officers were attempting to check on Diaz, a parolee who had missed a probation appointment. He allegedly pulled a knife on officers, who opened fire. He was taken by ambulance to a hospital and pronounced dead there.
2015-05-21	Gandara, David Alejandro (22)	Hispanic	Texas (El Paso)	Police shot an armed and possibly suicidal man after he was banging on the back door of a day care center. He ignored orders and allegedly attempted to retrieve a firearm in an alley. He died at the scene.
2015-05-20	Burtsfield, Nikki Jo (39)	White	Wyoming (Gillette)	When Campbell County Sheriff's deputies tried to approach Burtsfield, who was trespassing, she drove away and they chased her. After they used spike strips to stop her vehicle she got out brandishing a knife. She did not comply with commands to drop the knife, and some of the five deputies used their Tasers, but that did not subdue her. One of the deputies fired twice striking her in the chest and torso. She died a few minutes later. The Campbell County Coroner later found methamphetamine in her system.
2015-05-20	Wheeler, Marcus D. (26)	Black	Nebraska (Omaha)	Police were attempting to arrest Wheeler in connection with a 2014 shooting. Gunfire was exchanged and both Wheeler and an officer were fatally shot.
2015-05-20	Colley, Jonathan (52)	White	Ohio (Green)	A Summit County sheriff's deputy responded to an altercation between Colley and his stepfather at their home. Armed with a knife, Colley approached the deputy, despite commands to drop the weapon and a Taser deployment. The deputy fatally shot Colley.
2015-05-20	Talbott, Chrislon (38)	Black	Kentucky (Owensboro)	Owensboro Police officers conducting a drug investigation tracked Talbott to a motel where he and a woman were in a room. A negotiator was called in to try to talk Talbott into surrendering, but after several hours Talbott came out shooting. He was shot and killed by the police.
2015-05-20	Clark, Markus (26)		Florida (Fort Lauderdale)	Broward County sheriff's deputies called to a robbery at a gas station found Clark struggling with the employees. Several deputies were required to subdue and handcuff Clark. Deputies say he appeared to be under the influence of a drug. Clark was taken to a hospital where he died. His family said he used drugs, including "flakka".
2015-05-20	Cooper, James Anthony (43)		South Carolina (Charleston)	When they received a tip about Cooper's location, officers from North Charleston City Police and Charleston County Sheriff's Office attempted to serve an arrest warrant on Cooper. Cooper charged at a deputy with a knife or sharp object, cut the deputy in the face and hand, and they struggled. A police officer shot Cooper in the stomach. Cooper died at a hospital.
2015-05-19	Gaines, David (17)	White	Colorado (Grand Junction)	After a fight at home between Gaines and his father (which injured the father), Gaines left in a pickup truck with a long gun. The truck collided head on with 57-year-old motorcyclist Preston Ellis, killing Ellis, then striking a parked car. Gaines left the truck with gun in hand; witnesses called police. Gaines then attempted a carjacking of an SUV occupied by a woman with two children waiting for a third, who quickly followed his orders to get out. Police quickly arrived en masse and fatally shot Gaines.
2015-05-19	McIntosh, Jonathan (35)	White	Arkansas (Cabot)	During an investigation at a residence, Arkansas State Police officers questioning McIntosh (not the subject of their investigation) learned he had outstanding warrants. They took him into custody, handcuffed him, and placed him in a patrol car. When they returned to the car and opened the door to question him further he began shooting at them. The troopers returned fire, striking him several times. He died at a hospital.
2015-05-19	Nelson, Johnathan (31)		Alabama (Albertville)	A Marshall County Sheriff's deputy and Albertville Police officers were involved in a shooting at the deputy's home. It was reported that Nelson, high on drugs, jumped into one of the deputy's cars. He was struck with a Taser and then shot. He died a few days later. The Marshall County Grand Jury did not file charges.
2015-05-19	Rials-Torres, Alfredo (54)	Hispanic	Virginia (Arlington)	Officers from the Arlington County Police responded to a domestic disturbance call and through the open door saw an injured woman. They tried to enter but Rials-Torres tried to close the door, and there was a struggle during which Rials-Torres struck one officer with a metal pole, Rials-Torres was tased, and a second officer was accidentally tased, temporarily incapacitating him. The first officer facing Rials-Torres who was still attacking with the pole, shot Rials-Torres three times, fatally wounding him.
2015-05-19	Gomez, Anthony Quinn, Jr. (29)	Black	Pennsylvania (Lancaster)	Officers from the Lancaster Police went to an apartment to serve an arrest warrant on Gomez. When Gomez did not follow commands he was tased. He shot, striking one of the officers. A second officer shot and killed Gomez.
2015-05-17	Wade, Ronell (45)	Black	Illinois (Harvey)	Harvey Police officers responding to a reported robbery confronted Wade in a church parking lot. When he fired at police one officer shot and killed Wade. He had tried to hide money in church.
2015-05-17	Goodner, Austin (18)	White	Florida (St. Petersburg)	Officers were searching for Goodner at his home, in connection with a shooting earlier in the day. Goodner shot an officer in the leg and allegedly said "Go ahead, kill me. I want you to kill me" before raising his gun and being fatally shot by an officer.
2015-05-17	Jones, Timothy (27)	White	New Mexico (Ruidoso)	Police shot Jones after officers responded to a call about an alleged domestic disturbance. Jones died on scene.
2015-05-17	Fiel, Dennis Richard (34)	White	California (San Diego)	Police tried to pull over a speeding Jeep, which fled. The driver later bailed out and ran away from officers approaching on foot. While fleeing from police, the suspect pulled out a handgun and shot at them, striking one female officer in the upper torso. At least two other officers returned fire, killing the suspect.
2015-05-15	Farrar, Mark T. (41)	White	Illinois (Rockford)	Rockford Police were asked to do a welfare check on Mark T. Farrar, whom family members reported to be suicidal. When officers approached the home Farrar fired at them with a semi-automatic rifle. Officers shot and killed him.
2015-05-15	Coates, Matthew (42)	White	California (Sacramento)	A neighbor called police to report hearing a domestic disturbance next door. When police arrived over an hour later the woman let them in. Officers found Coates in a bedroom and spoke to him. Officers left the bedroom and asked Coates to come out. At that point, say police, Coates pointed a weapon at them. The woman told them it was only plastic. Police shot and killed Coates. The gun turned out to be a BB gun. The woman claims that by the time police arrived she and Coates were both asleep and that Coates told the police that he was mentally ill.
2015-05-14	Pelletier, Sean (37)	White	Michigan (Portage)	Pelletier's mother was trying to evict him and his two sisters from a house she wanted to sell. As a result, he was wanted for trespassing there, but detectives knew he had weapons inside the house and wanted to make the arrest away from home. Detectives identified Pelletier as a front seat passenger in a vehicle driven by his brother, and attempted a traffic stop. The vehicle fled and officers pursued. During the chase, Pelletier was observed to have a high-powered military-style rifle. After it crashed into a cruiser in front of an apartment complex, Pelletier exited the vehicle with the rifle and was fatally shot by police. The driver, Pelletier's brother, was also shot but still in critical condition several hours later.
2015-05-14	Martin, Cary Lloyd (53)	White	Florida (St. Augustine)	St. Johns County Sheriff's deputies responded to the home of a reportedly suicidal man armed with a rifle. When Martin did finally emerge he fired the weapon. Deputies shot and killed Martin.
2015-05-14	Reyes, Denis (40)		New York (Bronx)	New York Police responded to a call about an emotionally disturbed man and took the man into custody. He went into cardiac arrest and was transported to a hospital where he was pronounced dead. The family, who claim they were calling for medical help for their mentally disturbed son, has filed a complaint against the police. Police and family have different stories about the Denis Reyes's drug use before the incident.
2015-05-13	Hayes, Lorenzo (37)		Washington (Spokane)	Spokane Police officers arrested Hayes for violation of a domestic violence no-contact order and for possession of a gun. While in the booking area of Spokane County Jail Hayes became violent and was placed on the floor for a search. When placed in a restraint chair Hayes became unresponsive and was taken to a hospital where he was pronounced dead. No charges were filed against police or jail staff.
2015-05-12	Zalonka, Bruce (46)	Native Hawaiian	Hawaii (Honolulu)	Eight members of a fugitive task force went to apprehend Zalonka on an outstanding warrant. His van was found in a parking garage and he was in it. He refused to get out. Officers smashed a window and tried to stun him with a Taser. He then reportedly reached for a weapon and was fatally shot.
2015-05-12	Ouzounian, Alec (40)	White	California (Rancho Santa Margarita)	Orange County Sheriff's deputies were responding to a report of a suicidal man at a residence. When they entered the home there was a confrontation and the man was shot and killed.
2015-05-12	Stallworth, D'Angelo (28)	Black	Florida (Jacksonville)	Officers were visiting an apartment to ensure service of an eviction notice, entering the empty apartment with the aid of maintenance workers to find it empty and clean. One officer noticed a man outside on a shared balcony which has laundry rooms at each end. Officers went to question the man, who reached down, threw back a comforter that was on the floor outside the laundry room, and produced a handgun. There was a struggle over the gun but Stallworth broke free and ran down the stairs. At the bottom of the stairs he allegedly turned back toward officers, who did not know the gun had been dropped at the top of the stairs. Both officers fatally shot him in fear. Marijuana was later found under the comforter. Family and friends claim that Stallworth was too weak to hold a gun due to his multiple sclerosis.
2015-05-11	Way, Justin (28)	White	Washington (Tacoma)	Way was drunk, in bed with a large knife and threatening to hurt himself. His live-in girlfriend took away his bottle of vodka to pour out and called a non-emergency number to try to get him to a hospital for help, saying she did not feel threatened. Two sheriff's deputies with assault rifles responded, told his girlfriend to wait outside, then went in and shot Way while he was still lying on the bed. The detective relayed to Way's mother that "they told Justin to drop the knife and he didn't—so they shot him because 'That's what we do.'"
2015-05-11	Cunningham, Stephen (47)	White	Washington (Tacoma)	Officers responded to complaints of loud music. Cunningham allegedly grabbed a gun and walked outside. According to Cunningham's mother, he had had an altercation with a man earlier in the day and, when the police came, he mistakenly thought that man had returned. He did not fire his weapon at police.
2015-05-11	Goldston, Kelvin Antonie (30)	Black	Texas (Fort Worth)	Goldston had warrants for drugs and assault so when Fort Worth Police received a tip to his location they surrounded the residence. When Goldston exited and got into a vehicle, officers used their vehicles to block him in, getting out of the vehicles. Police say Goldston was shot and killed when he struck an officer as he attempted to drive away.
2015-05-10	Young, Lionel Lorenzo (34)	Black	Maryland (Landover)	Prince George's County Sheriff deputies called to a domestic violence dispute pursued Young's vehicle as he left the scene. After the chase led to a parking lot, Young's vehicle struck two of the deputies' cars. They then fired at his vehicle, striking and killing Young.
2015-05-09	Bayless, Martin Eugene (66)		Kansas (Carbondale)	Police used a Taser on Bayless on May 1 for "fleeing or attempting to elude" a Burlingame Police officer. He died on May 9.
2015-05-09	Holmes, Sam (31)		Minnesota (Fridley)	During a traffic stop, a man tried to drive away, dragging an officer with the vehicle. The officer shot and killed the driver.
2015-05-09	Gallagher, Michael Tyrone (55)		North Carolina (Enfield)	Enfield Police officer Jerry Powell responding to a reported break-in encountered Gallagher. In arresting Gallagher the officer used his Taser. Gallagher went into cardiac arrest and was pronounced dead at Halifax County Medical Center.
2015-05-08	Johnson, Shaun (35)	White	Arizona (Kearny)	Shaun Johnson was shot and killed after allegedly charging at officers with a samurai sword.
2015-05-08	Marshall, Dedrick (48)		Louisiana (Harvey)	Deputies from Jefferson Parish Sheriff's Office went to Marshall's home to investigate an aggravated assault. Sheriff's Office statements say that when Marshall pointed a pistol at the officers, Deputy Justin McLin shot once, killing Marshall.
2015-05-08	Schwalm, David A. (58)	White	New York (Constantia)	Oswego County Sheriff's deputies responding to a call for a welfare check on David Schwalm learned that Schwalm was armed with a shotgun when they arrived. They talked with him on the phone but could not get him to surrender. When he emerged from the house and levelled his shotgun at the officers Deputy Mark Walton shot and killed him.
2015-05-07	Arriguin, Nephi (21)	Black	California (Cerritos)	A Los Angeles County Sheriff's deputy was investigating a report of a female knocking on a resident's door asking for someone who did not live at the residence. The deputy found the car matching the description and arrested the woman standing by the car. Seeing a man in the car, the deputy ordered him to show his hands. Instead the man started the car and drove at the deputy so the deputy shot him. The car crashed about a block away. Nephi Arriguin died at the scene.
2015-05-07	Roy, Joseph (72)	White	Georgia (Lawrenceville)	Joseph Roy, 72 was shot and killed after officers responded to a suicidal person call. Officers opened fired after allegedly being charged at with an 8-inch steak knife.
2015-05-07	Murphy, Michael G. (35)	White	New York (Beacon)	Officers responded to a carjacking at knifepoint at approx. 3:30pm. The suspect abandoned the vehicle and police gave chase on foot through the woods and then over an interstate highway. After crossing the highway, the man was shot dead by officers.
2015-05-06	Kaafi, John Paul (33)		Florida (Sarasota)	Sarasota Police pulled Kaafi over for a traffic stop, beat him with a flashlight, and Tasered him. Police say they arrested him because of drugs they found in the car. At the jail he complained of an asthma attack and was taken to a hospital where he died.
2015-05-06	Champion, Jason (41)		New Jersey (Secaucus)	Champion and Laroche (below) were walking away from their disabled vehicle along the left side of the New Jersey Turnpike when they were struck and killed by a patrol car around 1:30 am. The patrol car had damage to the windshield and front end.
2015-05-06	Laroche, Nuwanah (34)		New Jersey (Secaucus)	Laroche and Champion (above) were walking away from their disabled vehicle along the left side of the New Jersey Turnpike when they were struck and killed by a patrol car around 1 am. The patrol car had damage to the windshield and front end.
2015-05-06	Johnson, David William (18)		North Carolina (Wake Forest)	After a chase, a depressed teen who had been getting into trouble with the law allegedly got out of his car in a shopping center parking lot and was seen running away from police. Since a caller to police earlier that evening had alleged Johnson was seen with a handgun, officers opened fire as he ran off, hitting him multiple times.
2015-05-05	Ma, Thong Kien (32)	Asian	California (South El Monte)	Ma was attacking two people with a meat cleaver in his neighborhood, one of whom later died from head lacerations. As Los Angeles sheriff's deputies approached Ma standing in front of a home on a flower bed, he was attacking a man with the cleaver and was demanded by officers to drop the weapon. They shot Ma.
2015-05-05	Glenn, Brendon (29)	Black	California (Venice/LA)	After a physical altercation between homeless Glenn, who was unarmed, and two officers, he was shot dead. Police chief Charlie Beck said he had yet to see evidence that justified the shooting. In April 2016 a police board ruled the shooting was not justified. In December 2016 the City of Los Angeles settled with Glenn's family, agreeing to pay $4 million.
2015-05-05	Frost, Robert (46)		Virginia (Pulaski)	An officer was checking a storage lot and saw a truck he believed was empty, but as he approached he noticed Robert Frost sleeping with a handgun in his lap. Apparently the suspect woke up suddenly and raised his firearm and opened fire. The officer went back to his truck and fired a couple rounds, hitting the suspect.
2015-05-04	Cook, Roark K. (36)	White	Washington (Kennewick)	Cook, who had a history of mental health issues and domestic violence against women, was in an apartment with two women and a child when officers from Richland Police and the Benton County Sheriff's Department, including a SWAT, went to the apartment on a tip from his mother. The officers helped the two women and the boy escape from the apartment, shooting at Cook during the rescue when he appeared with what turned out to be a replica weapon. When officers forced their way into the apartment Cook was mortally wounded but refused to surrender.
2015-05-04	Vasquez, Alfredo (38)		Texas (Alvin)	Alfredo Vasquez was wanted for kidnapping his month-old child from the child's mother. When Alvin Police officers found him hiding in his SUV parked at his mother's trailer they asked him to come out of the SUV. He fired three shots at police from his position in the cab of the SUV. After he told officers that the child was with his mother he fired again and officers returned fire, striking Vasquez in the head and mortally wounding him.
2015-05-03	Simpson, Elton (30)	Black	Texas (Garland)	Simpson and Soofi were shot dead after opening fire at an art exhibition featuring depictions of the Prophet Muhammad.
2015-05-03	Soofi, Nadir (34)	Asian	Texas (Garland)	Simpson and Soofi were shot dead after opening fire at an art exhibition featuring depictions of the Prophet Muhammad.
2015-05-03	Norton, Kevin Vance (36)	White	Utah (Roosevelt)	Police responded to a call about a man with a gun acting erratically. As officers approached, he fled to the woods. After negotiations and nonlethal attempts to disarm Norton, who was on felony probation and not allowed to possess a firearm, he was fatally shot.
2015-05-03	Grimm, Billy (44)	Hispanic	New Mexico (Albuquerque)	Police were responding to a possible domestic dispute and suspicious vehicle. Grimm was shot and killed. This case is being investigated.
2015-05-03	Asher, Michael (53)	White	Kentucky (Chavies)	Perry County Constable Ben Stidham, during a traffic stop, heard gunshots coming from a camper parked nearby so he called Kentucky State Police for help. State troopers tried to make contact with Asher, the camper's occupant. When Asher came out he raised his gun toward the State Police troopers who shot and killed him.
2015-05-03	Moore, Reginald L., Sr. (44)	Black	Mississippi (Greenville)	Reginald Moore and his wife Greenville Police Sergeant Kvonya Moore had just returned home from her birthday party when she shot and killed him.
2015-05-02	Mathena, Kenneth (52)	White	Delaware (Smyrna)	Mathena was armed with a shotgun and allegedly refused to drop it. The Delaware Department of Justice has concluded that the shooting was justified

== See also ==
- Death in custody § United States
- Henry A. Wallace Police Crime Public Database
- List of cases of police brutality
- List of countries with annual rates and counts for killings by law enforcement officers
- List of law enforcement officers killed in the line of duty in the United States
- List of law enforcement officers convicted for an on-duty killing in the United States
- List of shootings by US immigration agents
- List of police reforms related to the George Floyd protests
- List of unarmed African Americans killed by law enforcement officers in the United States
- Lists of killings by law enforcement officers
- Police brutality in the United States
- Police misconduct § United States
- Police riot § United States
- Police use of deadly force in the United States
