= Oregon Route 260 =

State highway in Josephine County, Oregon, US

Oregon Route 260
- Route 260 highlighted in red

Route information
- Maintained by ODOT
- Length: 20.84 mi (33.54 km)
- Existed: 2003–present

Major junctions
- West end: US 199 near Grants Pass
- East end: Lower River Road near Grants Pass

Location
- Country: United States
- State: Oregon
- County: Josephine

Highway system
- Oregon Highways; Interstate; US; State; Named; Scenic
← OR 255	→ OR 273

Oregon Route 260 (OR 260) is an Oregon state highway running from the west side of Grants Pass to US 199 near Grants Pass. OR 260 is known as the Rogue River Loop Highway No. 260 (see Oregon highways and routes). It is 20.84 miles (33.54 km) long and runs in a half-loop from northeast to southwest, entirely within Josephine County.

OR 260 was established in 2003 as part of Oregon's project to assign route numbers to highways that previously were not assigned.

== Route description ==
OR 260 begins at an intersection with Upper River Road at Grants Pass and heads west and north along the Rogue River before crossing the river and heading south to an intersection with US 199 approximately five miles southwest of Grants Pass, where it ends.

== History ==
OR 260 was assigned to the Rogue River Loop Highway in 2003.

== Major intersections ==
The entire route is in Josephine County.

Location	mi	km	Destinations	Notes
	12.78	20.57	Begin state maintenance	
	22.24	35.79	US 199 – Grants Pass, Cave Junction	
1.000 mi = 1.609 km; 1.000 km = 0.621 mi
