= Kerby, Oregon =

Unincorporated community in the state of Oregon, United States

- Census-designated place
- Location within Oregon Location within the United States
- Coordinates: 42°11′40″N 123°39′2″W
- Country: United States
- State: Oregon
- County: Josephine

Area
  - Total: 2.61 sq mi (6.77 km^{2})
  - Land: 2.58 sq mi (6.68 km^{2})
  - Water: 0.035 sq mi (0.09 km^{2})
- Elevation: 1,267 ft (386 m)

Population (2020)
  - Total: 628
  - Density: 243.4/sq mi (93.96/km^{2})
- Time zone: UTC-8 (Pacific (PST))
  - Summer (DST): UTC-7 (PDT)
- ZIP code: 97531
- Area codes: 458 and 541
- FIPS code: 41-38900
- GNIS feature ID: 1144563

Kerby is an unincorporated community and census-designated place (CDP) in Josephine County, Oregon, United States, north of Cave Junction on U.S. Route 199. As of the 2020 census, Kerby had a population of 628. Despite its population and numerous businesses, it is often listed in tourist guides as a ghost town, because of the number of historic buildings left from its days as a gold-mining town. Kerby came into existence between 1854 and 1857.

== History ==
Kerby was named for James Kerby (or Kerbey, as he sometimes spelled his name). The community was founded during the heyday of Josephine County gold mining and went through numerous name changes (and various spellings) in its early years. When Josephine County was established on January 22, 1856, a new county seat was to be chosen in the next county election. The original county seat was a place called "Sailor Diggings" (which was eventually renamed Waldo). One of the polling places listed was called "Kirbey's Ranch". James Kerby and Samuel Hicks, partners in a general mercantile and supply business, probably founded the town of "Kerbeyville" for the county seat race, and the town was selected in the election of June 1857.

An act of the territorial legislature of December 18, 1856, changed the name from "Kirbeyville" to "Napoleon", possibly because of the association of Napoleon with the name Josephine. The new name was not popular, and a bill was introduced in the next legislature that would change it back. The bill passed the House but was then held up in the Senate judiciary committee. Though the county commissioners used the name "Napoleon" for a short time, they reverted to calling the place "Kerbyville" in about April 1860. The name "Kerbyville" was used officially for many years despite the failure of the legislature to restore it. The name was finally changed to "Kerby" for the sake of simplicity. Grants Pass became the county seat in 1886.

The history of the name of the post office in this locale is simpler: Kerby post office was established in September 1856; it was later made a rural station of Cave Junction. The post office was proposed to be closed in 2009.

== Geography ==
Kerby is in southwestern Josephine County, along U.S. Route 199 on the east side of the valley of the Illinois River, a north-flowing tributary of the Rogue River. Kerby is bordered to the south by the city of Cave Junction. US 199 leads northeast 27 miles (43 km) to Grants Pass and south through Cave Junction 55 miles (89 km) to Crescent City, California.

According to the U.S. Census Bureau, the Kerby CDP has an area of 2.6 square miles (6.7 km^{2}), all of it recorded as land.

== Demographics ==
Historical population
Census	Pop.	Note	%±
2020	628		—
U.S. Decennial Census

== Points of interest ==
- Kerbyville Museum, established in 1959

== Climate ==
This region experiences warm (but not hot) and dry summers, with no average monthly temperatures above 71.6 °F (22.0 °C). According to the Köppen climate classification system, Kerby has a warm-summer Mediterranean climate, abbreviated "Csb" on climate maps.
