= Lost Creek Airport (Michigan) =

Public use airport in Luzerne, Michigan

- IATA: none; ICAO: none; FAA LID: 5Y4

Summary
- Airport type: Public
- Owner: U.S. Dept. of Agriculture
- Serves: Luzerne, Michigan
- Time zone: UTC−05:00 (-5)
  - Summer (DST): UTC−04:00 (-4)
- Elevation AMSL: 1,051 ft / 320 m
- Coordinates: 44°39′36″N 084°14′15″W
- Interactive map of Lost Creek Airport

Runways
| Direction | Length | | Surface |
| Direction | ft | m | Surface |
|---|---|---|---|
| 18/36 | 2,600 | 792 | Turf |
| 5/23 | 2,200 | 671 | Turf |

Statistics (2015)
- Aircraft operations: 150
- Source: Federal Aviation Administration

Lost Creek Airport (FAA LID: 5Y4) is a public use airport located three nautical miles (6 km) northeast of the central business district of Luzerne, in Oscoda County, Michigan, United States. It is owned by the U.S. Department of Agriculture.

A couple flying a Cessna 150 disappeared while en route to the Lost Creek Airport on July 4, 1977. It is thought that they went down after encountering a violent band of thunderstorms mid-flight. A 10-day search for the aircraft was conducted after it failed to show up, but no signs of the aircraft were found. Search parties looking for signs of the aircraft have been sent as recently as 2022.

== Facilities and aircraft ==
Lost Creek Airport covers an area of 77 acres (31 ha) at an elevation of 1,051 feet (320 m) above mean sea level. It has two runways with turf surfaces: runway 18/36 is 2,600 by 100 feet (792 x 30 m), and runway 5/23 is 2,200 by 100 feet (671 x 30 m).

For the 12-month period ending December 31, 2015, the airport had 150 annual general aviation aircraft operations. For the same time period, 1 aircraft is based at the airport, a single-engine airplane.

There is no fixed-base operator at the airport, and no fuel is available.

== See also ==
- List of airports in Michigan
