= Merlin, Oregon =

Unincorporated community in the state of Oregon, United States

- Census-designated place
- Location within Oregon Location within the United States
- Coordinates: 42°31′04″N 123°25′13″W
- Country: United States
- State: Oregon
- County: Josephine

Area
  - Total: 4.17 sq mi (10.79 km^{2})
  - Land: 4.16 sq mi (10.77 km^{2})
  - Water: 0.0077 sq mi (0.02 km^{2})
- Elevation: 907 ft (276 m)

Population (2020)
  - Total: 1,690
  - Density: 406.5/sq mi (156.94/km^{2})
- Time zone: UTC-8 (Pacific (PST))
  - Summer (DST): UTC-7 (PDT)
- ZIP code: 97532
- Area codes: 458 and 541
- FIPS code: 41-47650
- GNIS feature ID: 1166680

Merlin is an unincorporated community and census-designated place (CDP) in Josephine County, Oregon, United States. As of the 2020 census, Merlin had a population of 1,690. The area is known for sport fishing and whitewater rafting on the Rogue River. Merlin's ZIP code is 97532.

A new railroad station in this location in 1883 was called "Jump Off Joe" for a local stream. The station was renamed "Merlin" in October 1886. The name came from a railroad civil engineer who named it for the merlins (a type of falcon) he saw in the area. "McAllister" post office was established about a mile north of Merlin in 1885, then moved to the vicinity of the railroad station and renamed Merlin in 1891.

== Geography ==
Merlin is located 9 miles (14 km) northwest of Grants Pass. It sits in the valley of Jumpoff Joe Creek, 4 miles (6 km) east of where that stream joins the Rogue River. According to the U.S. Census Bureau, the Merlin CDP has a total area of 4.27 square miles (11.07 km^{2}), of which 0.01 square miles (0.02 km^{2}), or 0.19%, are water.

Merlin lies at an elevation of about 277 m (909 ft) above MSL.

== Demographics ==
Historical population
Census	Pop.	Note	%±
2020	1,690		—
U.S. Decennial Census
