= Selma, Oregon =

Unincorporated community in Oregon, US

- Census-designated place
- Location within Oregon Location within the United States
- Coordinates: 42°16′45″N 123°36′57″W
- Country: United States
- State: Oregon
- County: Josephine

Area
  - Total: 6.46 sq mi (16.72 km^{2})
  - Land: 6.46 sq mi (16.72 km^{2})
  - Water: 0 sq mi (0.00 km^{2})
- Elevation: 1,325 ft (404 m)

Population (2020)
  - Total: 661
  - Density: 102.4/sq mi (39.52/km^{2})
- Time zone: UTC-8 (Pacific (PST))
  - Summer (DST): UTC-7 (PDT)
- ZIP code: 97538
- Area codes: 541 and 458
- FIPS code: 41-66150
- GNIS feature ID: 1149227

Selma is an unincorporated community and census-designated place (CDP) in Josephine County, Oregon, United States. As of the 2010 census it had a population of 695. As of the 2020 United States census it had a total population of 661. It is located in the ZIP code of 97538.

== Geography ==
Selma is just southwest of the center of Josephine County, in the valley of Deer Creek, a west-flowing tributary of the Illinois River and part of the Rogue River watershed. U.S. Route 199 passes through the center of town, leading south 8 miles (13 km) to Cave Junction and northeast 20 miles (32 km) to Grants Pass, the county seat.

According to the U.S. Census Bureau, the Selma CDP has an area of 6.4 square miles (16.7 km^{2}), all of it recorded as land.

== Demographics ==
The largest ethnic group in Selma is White (Non-Hispanic) (95.9%). 98.7% of the residents in Selma, OR are U.S. citizens.

In 2022, the median property value in Selma, OR was $253,400, and the homeownership rate was 88.8%.

Historical population
Census	Pop.	Note	%±
2020	661		—
U.S. Decennial Census

== Notable residents ==
Actor John Wayne used to visit the Deer Creek Ranch one mile west of Selma; it is now the Siskiyou Field Institute. He grew fond of the area after filming Rooster Cogburn along the Rogue River. Also from Selma is Kristy Lee Cook, who came in 7th place on American Idol season 7. Craig Wright, major league baseball's first sabermetrician, lived for a time as a young man in Selma while working in nearby Grants Pass.
