= Wilderville, Oregon =

Unincorporated community in the state of Oregon, United States

- Unincorporated community
- Location within Oregon Location within the United States
- Coordinates: 42°22′56″N 123°28′01″W
- Country: United States
- State: Oregon
- County: Josephine
- Elevation: 922 ft (281 m)
- Time zone: UTC-8 (Pacific (PST))
  - Summer (DST): UTC-7 (PDT)
- ZIP code: 97543
- Area code: 541
- GNIS feature ID: 1152356

Wilderville is an unincorporated community in Josephine County, Oregon, United States. Wilderville is located along U.S. Route 199 southwest of Grants Pass. Wilderville has a post office with ZIP code 97543.
