= Hiouchi, California =

Hiouchi
- Census-designated place
- Location in California
- Coordinates: 41°47′33″N 124°04′19″W
- Country: United States
- State: California
- County: Del Norte

Area
  - Total: 0.580 sq mi (1.502 km^{2})
  - Land: 0.580 sq mi (1.502 km^{2})
  - Water: 0 sq mi (0 km^{2}) 0%
- Elevation: 171 ft (52 m)

Population (April 1, 2020)
  - Total: 314
  - Density: 541/sq mi (209/km^{2})
- Time zone: UTC-8 (Pacific)
  - Summer (DST): UTC-7 (PDT)
- FIPS code: 06-33935
- GNIS feature IDs: 261367, 2611435

Hiouchi (Tolowa: Xaa-yuu-chit) is a census-designated place in Del Norte County, California, United States. It is located on the Smith River, 7.5 miles (12 km) east-northeast of Crescent City, at an elevation of 171 feet (52 m). Its population is 314 as of the 2020 census, up from 301 from the 2010 census.

== Climate ==
Hiouchi has a warm-summer mediterranean climate (Csb) typical of coastal California with moderate temperatures year-round consisting of mild to warm summers and cool, very rainy winters.

Climate data for Hiouchi, California 459ft(140m) (1981-2010)
| Month | Jan | Feb | Mar | Apr | May | Jun | Jul | Aug | Sep | Oct | Nov | Dec | Year |
|---|---|---|---|---|---|---|---|---|---|---|---|---|---|
| Mean daily maximum °F (°C) | 52.8 (11.6) | 55.3 (12.9) | 58.6 (14.8) | 60.3 (15.7) | 65.2 (18.4) | 69.8 (21.0) | 73.5 (23.1) | 72.4 (22.4) | 72.7 (22.6) | 66.9 (19.4) | 56.7 (13.7) | 52.2 (11.2) | 63.0 (17.2) |
| Daily mean °F (°C) | 45.8 (7.7) | 47.3 (8.5) | 49.2 (9.6) | 50.9 (10.5) | 55.2 (12.9) | 59.4 (15.2) | 62.6 (17.0) | 62.2 (16.8) | 61.2 (16.2) | 56.3 (13.5) | 49.2 (9.6) | 45.5 (7.5) | 53.7 (12.1) |
| Mean daily minimum °F (°C) | 38.9 (3.8) | 39.3 (4.1) | 39.8 (4.3) | 41.4 (5.2) | 45.1 (7.3) | 49.1 (9.5) | 51.8 (11.0) | 51.9 (11.1) | 49.6 (9.8) | 45.8 (7.7) | 41.8 (5.4) | 38.8 (3.8) | 44.4 (6.9) |
| Average precipitation inches (mm) | 12.35 (314) | 11.52 (293) | 10.67 (271) | 6.96 (177) | 4.22 (107) | 2.06 (52) | 0.38 (9.7) | 0.58 (15) | 1.33 (34) | 5.19 (132) | 11.16 (283) | 15.11 (384) | 81.53 (2,071.7) |
| Average relative humidity (%) | 79.7 | 77.7 | 76.1 | 75.1 | 72.5 | 72.6 | 71.9 | 72.9 | 66.6 | 70.2 | 78.8 | 79.4 | 74.5 |
| Average dew point °F (°C) | 39.9 (4.4) | 40.7 (4.8) | 42.0 (5.6) | 43.3 (6.3) | 46.5 (8.1) | 50.6 (10.3) | 53.4 (11.9) | 53.4 (11.9) | 50.0 (10.0) | 46.7 (8.2) | 42.9 (6.1) | 39.5 (4.2) | 45.7 (7.7) |
Source: NOAA, PRISM

Hiouchi, California May 2023 (view as a 360° interactive panorama)

== Demographics ==
Historical population
| Census | Pop. | Note | %± |
|---|---|---|---|
| 2010 | 301 | | — |
| 2020 | 314 | | 4.3% |
U.S. Decennial Census; 2010

Hiouchi first appeared as a census designated place in the 2010 U.S. census.

The 2020 United States census reported that Hiouchi had a population of 314. The population density was 541.4 inhabitants per square mile (209.0/km^{2}). The racial makeup of Hiouchi was 270 (86.0%) White, 3 (1.0%) African American, 12 (3.8%) Native American, 4 (1.3%) Asian, 0 (0.0%) Pacific Islander, 3 (1.0%) from other races, and 22 (7.0%) from two or more races. Hispanic or Latino of any race were 16 persons (5.1%).

The whole population lived in households. There were 142 households, out of which 36 (25.4%) had children under the age of 18 living in them, 71 (50.0%) were married-couple households, 12 (8.5%) were cohabiting couple households, 24 (16.9%) had a female householder with no partner present, and 35 (24.6%) had a male householder with no partner present. 47 households (33.1%) were one person, and 19 (13.4%) were one person aged 65 or older. The average household size was 2.21. There were 90 families (63.4% of all households).

The age distribution was 38 people (12.1%) under the age of 18, 18 people (5.7%) aged 18 to 24, 50 people (15.9%) aged 25 to 44, 106 people (33.8%) aged 45 to 64, and 102 people (32.5%) who were 65 years of age or older. The median age was 56.3 years. For every 100 females, there were 97.5 males.

There were 171 housing units at an average density of 294.8 units per square mile (113.8 units/km^{2}), of which 142 (83.0%) were occupied. Of these, 89 (62.7%) were owner-occupied, and 53 (37.3%) were occupied by renters.

The filming of the Ewoks portion of Return of the Jedi was at Jedidiah Smith State Park just west of Hiouchi.

== Politics ==
In the state legislature, Hiouchi is in the 2nd senatorial district, represented by Democrat Mike McGuire, and the 2nd Assembly district, represented by Democrat Chris Rogers.

Federally, Hiouchi is in California's 2nd congressional district, represented by Democrat Jared Huffman.

== Notable people ==
- Greg Noll, surfer
