= Waldo, Oregon =

- Ghost town
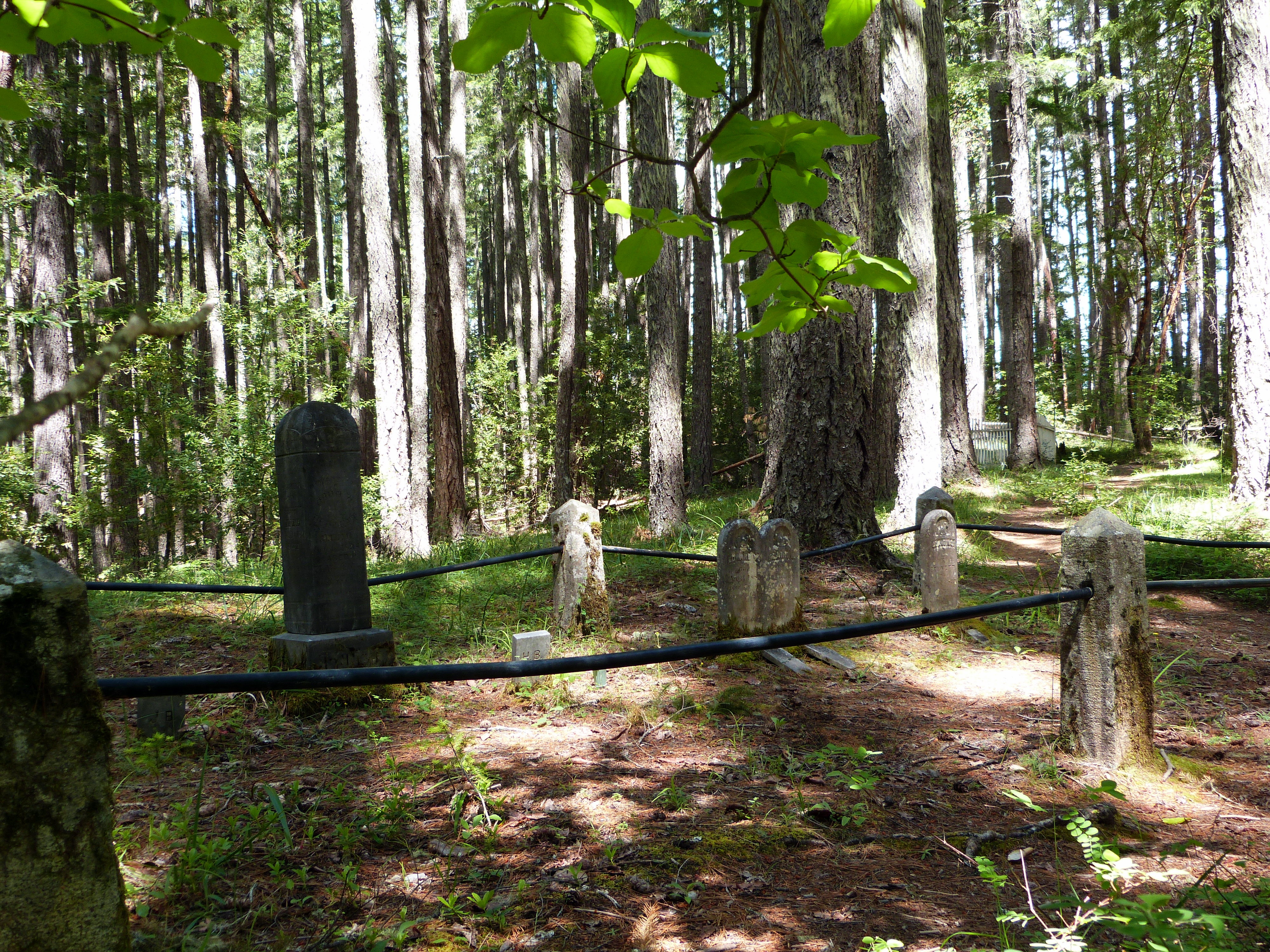
- Waldo Cemetery

- Location within Oregon Location within the United States
- Coordinates: 42°3′40″N 123°38′49″W
- Country: United States
- State: Oregon
- County: Josephine
- Time zone: UTC-8 (Pacific (PST))
  - Summer (DST): UTC-7 (PDT)

Waldo is a ghost town located in Josephine County, Oregon, United States, about three miles from the California border. It was settled in 1852 as a gold mining camp called Sailor's Diggings. The place was later renamed "Waldo" in honor of William Waldo, who in 1853 was the Whig candidate for governor of California. This was apparently because, believing the settlement was in California, William Waldo campaigned there and convinced the populace that they should vote for him. The town was the first county seat of Josephine County. The post office for Waldo was established in 1856; service was discontinued in 1928.

== See also ==
- List of ghost towns in Oregon
