= Illinois River (Oregon) =

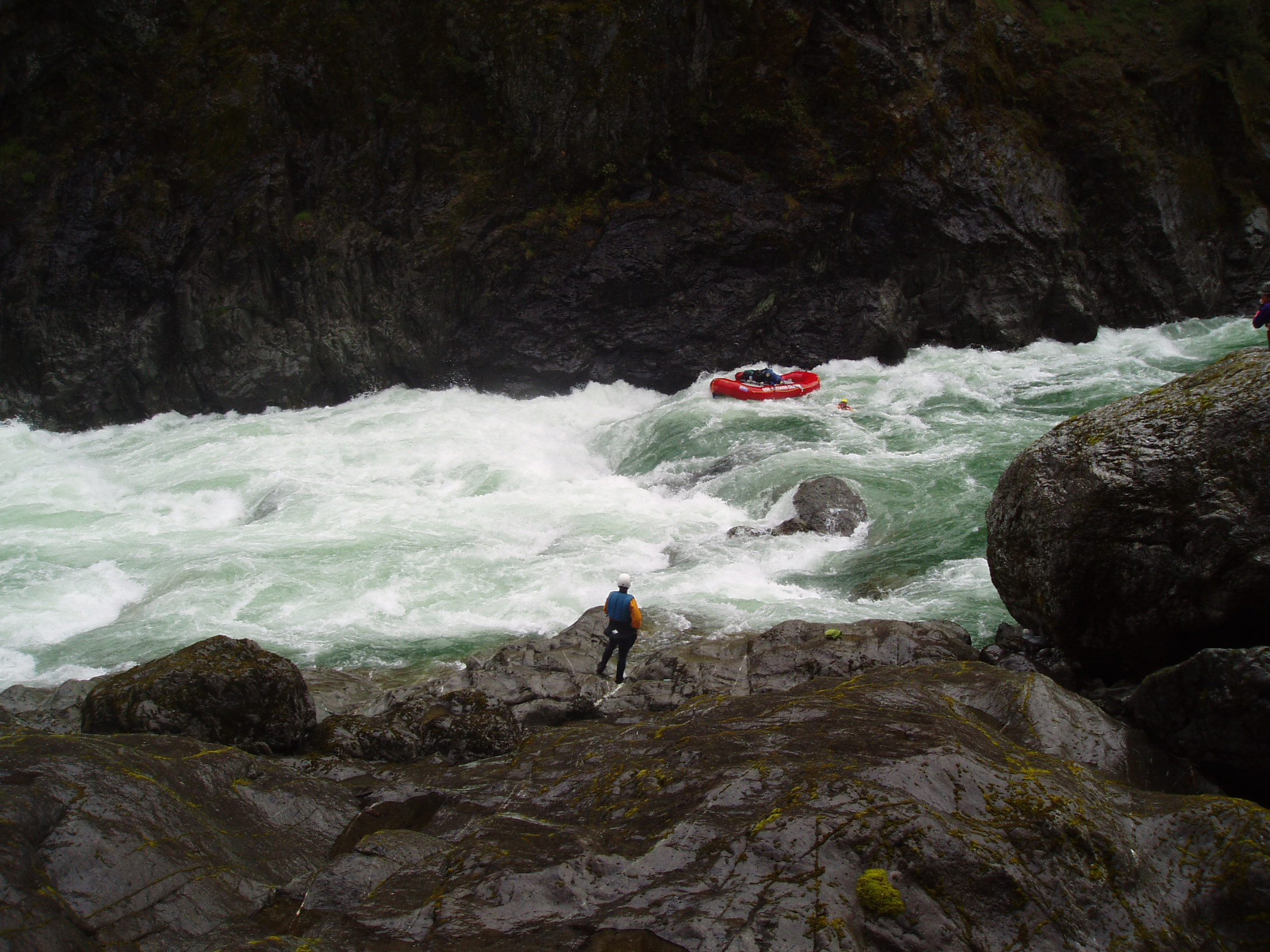
- Rafting the Green Wall Rapids on the Illinois River

- Location of the mouth of the Illinois River in Oregon
- Etymology: The U.S. state of Illinois, the birthplace of three brothers named Althouse who emigrated to Oregon and mined for gold along Althouse Creek and the Illinois River

Location
- Country: United States
- State: Oregon
- County: Josephine and Curry

Physical characteristics
- Source: Confluence of East Fork Illinois River and West Fork Illinois River
  - location: near Cave Junction, Josephine County, Oregon
  - coordinates: 42°09′35″N 123°39′33″W
  - elevation: 1,271 ft (387 m)
- Mouth: Rogue River
  - location: Agness, Curry County, Oregon
  - coordinates: 42°33′00″N 124°03′58″W
  - elevation: 102 ft (31 m)
- Length: 56 mi (90 km) (Note: The distance between the source and the upstream boundary of the Wild and Scenic section, which begins at river mile (RM) 50.4 (river kilometer 81.1) and ends at the mouth, is an estimate based on map scale and ruler.)
- Basin size: 983 sq mi (2,550 km^{2})
- Discharge
  - location: near Kerby, 50.3 miles (81.0 km) from the mouth
  - average: 1,262 cu ft/s (35.7 m^{3}/s)
  - minimum: 121 cu ft/s (3.4 m^{3}/s)
  - maximum: 92,200 cu ft/s (2,610 m^{3}/s)

National Wild and Scenic River
- Type: Wild, Scenic, Recreational
- Designated: 19 October 1984

The Illinois River is a tributary, about 56 miles (90 km) long, of the Rogue River in the U.S. state of Oregon. It drains part of the Klamath Mountains in northern California and southwestern Oregon. The river's main stem begins at the confluence of its east and west forks near Cave Junction in southern Josephine County. Its drainage basin includes Sucker Creek, which rises in the Red Buttes Wilderness, near Whiskey Peak on the California state line. The main stem flows generally northwest in a winding course past Kerby and through the Siskiyou National Forest and Kalmiopsis Wilderness. It joins the Rogue River from the south at Agness 4.75 miles NW of the Curry–Josephine county line, (US Geological Survey National Map measure tool) and 27 miles (43 km) from the Pacific Ocean, 16.8 miles as the crow flies.

The river's lower 50.4 miles (81.1 km), from where it enters the Rogue River–Siskiyou National Forest downstream from Kerby to its confluence with the Rogue River, were designated Wild and Scenic in 1984. Of this, 28.7 miles (46.2 km) is protected as wild, 17.9 miles (28.8 km) as scenic, and 3.8 miles (6.1 km) as recreational.

== Tributaries ==
Sucker Creek is named after the state of Illinois, one of whose nicknames is the Sucker State. Miners from Illinois named the creek. In 2011, the United States Forest Service worked on a project to improve the creek. The project is a fishery rehabilitation project.

== Rafting and kayaking ==
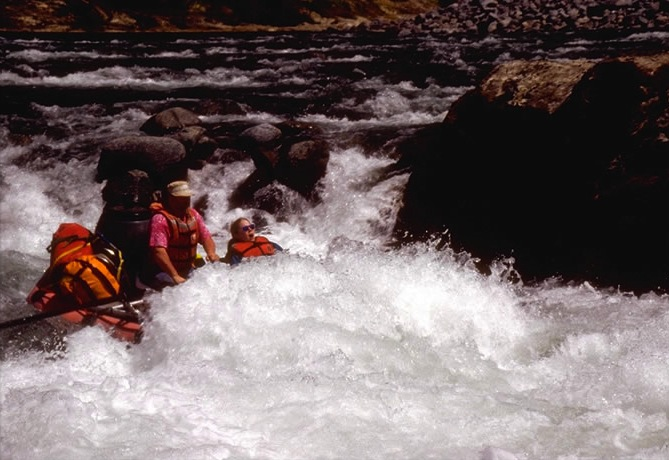
Illinois River Rafters

The Illinois River is "a wilderness river that tests both the skill and strength of boaters". For the 31-mile (50 km) run along the Wild and Scenic part of the river between upper Oak Flat near Kerby and lower Oak Flat, boaters are far from trails and roads. In fact, it is "the most inaccessible river canyon in the lower 48 states..." with sections that are inaccessible, even by trail. (Note: Due to the ruggedness of the canyon, the Illinois River Trail (the path of which run 27 miles somewhat near the Illinois River) never actually reaches the riverbank.) Depending on the water flow, this stretch of the river has eight class IV to IV+ rapids. Green Wall, a class V, "is considerably more difficult and longer than the others" and below it lie 3 miles (4.8 km) of difficult rapids. The river is generally run by raft or kayak during the rainy season, October through April. At flows below 800 cubic feet per second (23 m^{3}/s), boating is difficult because of exposed rocks, and flows above 3,000 cubic feet per second (85 m^{3}/s) "turn the river into boiling holes and rapids." A heavy rain can turn an ordinary trip into a high-water nightmare.

Permits from the U.S. Forest Service are required (year round) for river trips on the Wild Section of the river (between Briggs Creek and Nancy Creek) and groups are limited to no more than twelve. However, the permits for non-commercial groups are free and are self issued 24/7, but the permit must also be deposited at Oak Flat to verify the safe completion of the trip. Since there is no dam on the Illinois River, river flows are highly dependent upon weather conditions. Changing weather can often result in water levels being too high or too low for safe and successful navigation. Furthermore, since water levels can rise rapidly, potential bad weather can also be the cause for cancelled or postponed trips. (Note: In March 1998, a flash flood on the Illinois River resulted in the death of two rafters and required the helicopter rescue of ten others.) Nevertheless, even under acceptable conditions, the Illinois River can still cause casualties.

== See also ==
- List of longest streams of Oregon
- List of rivers of Oregon
