= California Historical Landmarks in Del Norte County =

This list includes properties and districts listed on the California Historical Landmark listing in Del Norte County, California. Click the "Map of all coordinates" link to the right to view a Google map of all properties and districts with latitude and longitude coordinates in the table below.

Image		Landmark name	Location	City or town	Summary
Battery Point Lighthouse	951	Battery Point Lighthouse	Battery Point Island; 41°44′38″N 124°12′12″W	Crescent City	
Brother Jonathan Cemetery	541	Brother Jonathan Cemetery	Brother Jonathan Vista Point; 41°45′03″N 124°12′40″W	Crescent City	Also on the NRHP list as NPS-02000535
Camp Lincoln	545	Camp Lincoln	Kings Valley Rd. 41°49′11″N 124°08′09″W	Crescent City	
Crescent City Plank and Turnpike Road	645	Crescent City Plank and Turnpike Road	Parkway Dr. & Elk Valley Rd. 41°48′08″N 124°08′27″W	Crescent City	
Upload Photo	544	Fort Ter-Wer	Ter-Wer Riffle and Klamath Glen Rds. 41°30′36″N 123°59′19″W	Klamath	Also known as Fort Ter-Waw
Tolowa Indian Settlements	649	Tolowa Indian Settlements	1886 Pebble Beach Dr. 41°45′25″N 124°13′17″W	Crescent City	
S.S. Emidio	497	S.S. Emidio	Beach Front Park and Picnic Area; 41°45′02″N 124°11′48″W	Crescent City	

== See also ==
- List of California Historical Landmarks
- National Register of Historic Places listings in Del Norte County, California
