= Redwood Coast Transit =

- Parent: Redwood Coast Transit Authority
- Headquarters: Redwood Coast Transit 140 Williams Rd., Crescent City.
- Locale: Del Norte County, California
- Routes: 7
- Hubs: Crescent City Cultural Center
- Depots: Redwood Coast Transit Yard 140 Williams Drive, Crescent City
- Daily ridership: Weekday: 390 Saturday/Holiday: 200
- Annual ridership: 110,691 (2019)
- Operator: First Transit
- Transit Manager: Joe Rye
- Website: redwoodcoasttransit.org

Redwood Coast Transit (RCT) provides bus service in Del Norte County, California, United States. The service offers 4 City Routes that operate in Crescent City, 2 regional routes that provide connections to Gasquet and Arcata, and a school route that provides 1 daily trip from Del Norte High School. RCT also offers a Dial A Ride service which primarily provides ADA Paratransit Service but the general public can pay a surcharge to use the service as well.

== Fares ==
RTC has two types of fare: Local Fares paid on local routes and Zone Based Fares on Regional Routes. Youth, Seniors and people with a disability can receive a discounted fare.

== COVID-19 Response ==
In April 2020, evening trips on all lines and weekend service on lines 2 and 4 were discontinued due to reduced demand and staffing levels as a result of the COVID-19 pandemic. On March 23, 2020, RCT eliminated fare collection to promote social distancing between passengers and operators, however this led to a spike in non-essential trips and operator complaints about crowded buses which lead RCT to resume fare collection in early April 2020.

== Routes ==
=== Local Routes ===
Route #	Destinations	Service Hours
1 - Parkway/El Darado	College of the Redwoods, Safeway, Walmart, Cultural Center	Mon-Sat 7a-6p
2 - A/Inyo/ Washington	College of the Redwoods, Safeway, Walmart, Cultural Center	Mon-Fri 7a-5:30p
3 - Northcrest	Cultural Center, Senior Center	Mon-Sat 7a-5:30p
4 - Bertsch / Howland Hill	Cultural Center, Safeway, Rite Aide, Elk Valley Casino	Mon-Fri 7:30a-6p

=== Regional Routes ===
Route #	Destinations	Service Hours
20 - Smith River / Crescent City / Arcata	Lucky 7 Casino, Ft. Dick, College of the Redwoods, Cultural Center, Prairie Creek State Park, Orick Redwood National Park, Arcata Transit Center	Mon-Fri 6a-7p
199 – Crescent City / Gasquet	Cultural Center, Sutter Hospital, College of the Redwoods, Jedediah Smith Redwood State Park Visitor Center, Gasquet Market	Mon-Fri 7a-2p

=== School Route ===
Route #	Destinations	Service Hours
300 - DNHS PM Tripper	Del Norte High School, Cultural Center, Walmart, Senior Center	1 trip leaving DNHS at 3:25p
