= Tolowa Indian Settlements =

Historical Landmark in Crescent City, California, United States

Tolowa Indian Village Sites
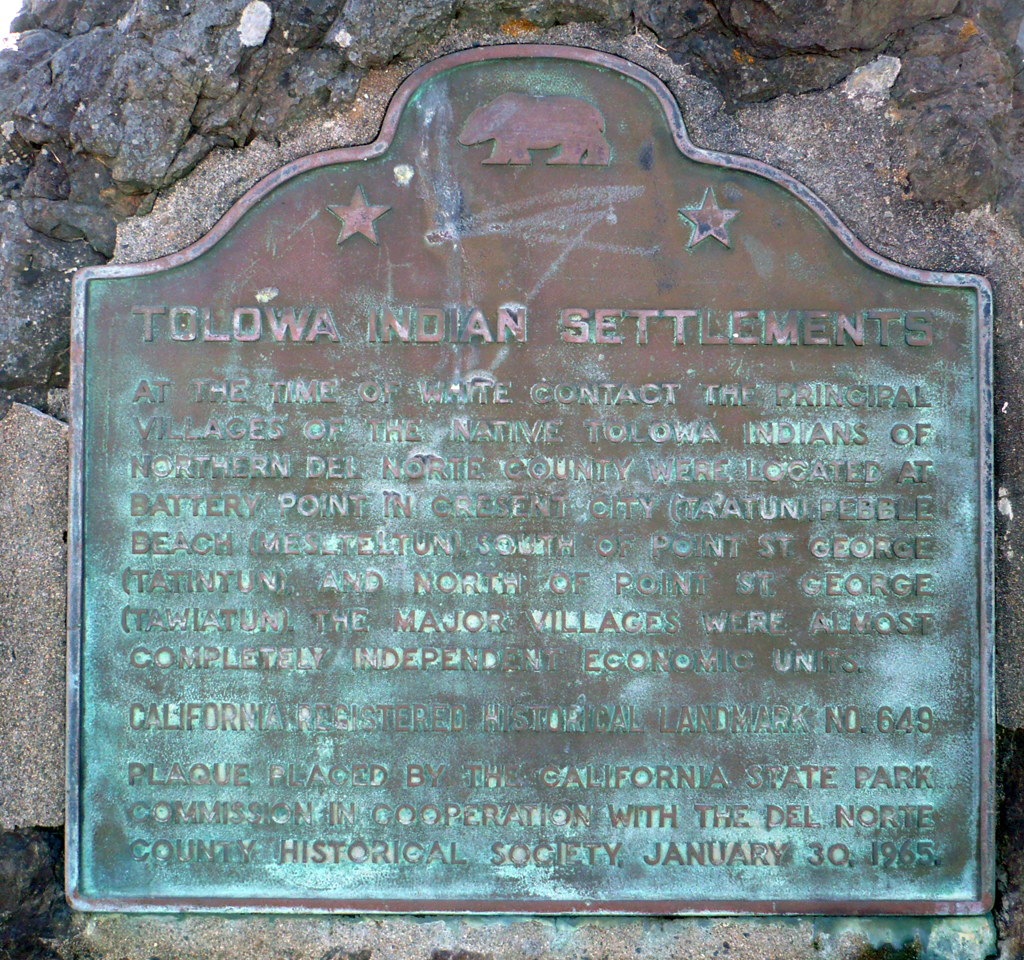
- Tolowa Indian Village Site marker

- Location within California Location within the United States
- 41.75692°N 124.2214°W
- Location: 1886 Pebble Beach Drive, Crescent City, California

California Historical Landmark
- Reference no.: 649

Tolowa Indian Village Site is a historical site in Crescent City, California in Del Norte County. The Native America Tolowa Tribe had villages in what is now northern Del Norte County. The villages were on Battery Point, Pebble Beach, south of Point St. George, and north of Point St. George. There were a number of large independent Tolowa villages in the area. The site is a California Historical Landmark No. 649. A marker was placed on the site in 1965 by the California State Park Commission working with the Del Norte County Historical Society.

== Tolowa Dee-niʼ Nation ==
The Tolowa of Crescent City are part of the Tolowa Dee-niʼ Nation a federally recognized tribe established in 1906.

== See also ==
- California Historical Landmarks in Del Norte County
- Tolowa language
- Tututni tribe
