= Fort Dick =

Fort Dick or Fort Dix may refer to:

- Fort Dick, California is a small unincorporated city in Del Norte County, California.
- Fort Dix (NJ) is a large United States Army installation located in the state of New Jersey.
- Fort Dickinson (PA) was active from 1769 to 1784 during three Connecticut Yankee-Pennamite Wars.
