= Camp Lincoln (California) =

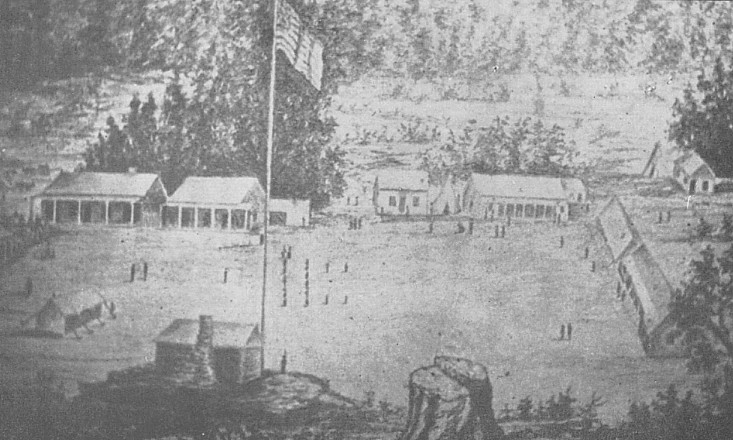
- Camp Lincoln in 1862, sketched by Private George B. Young

- Location within California
- 41.819847°N 124.135853°W
- Location: Crescent City, California

California Historical Landmark
- Designated: 1962
- Reference no.: 545

Camp Lincoln (also known as Long's Camp, Fort Long, Lincoln's Fort, or Fort Lincoln), in Crescent City, California, was a United States military post. It was established June 13, 1862, by the men of Company G, 2nd Regiment, Infantry, California Volunteers to keep peace between the Tolowa tribe of Native Americans and the miners and settlers of northwestern California.

When the California Gold Rush began, people from all over the country ran to Gold Country to try to make their fortunes. Likewise in northwestern California, many men headed that way, leaving their wives, children, and homes. The Tolowa were being forcibly resettled in the region and were beginning to take their vengeance on those who stayed behind. Settlers petitioned the Army for protection, but their pleas were not well received by the Department of the Pacific, whose troops were already stretched thin from protecting stagecoach travelers.

However, the petitioners eventually got their wish, and Fort Ter-Waw was established. After that was destroyed by the Great Flood of 1862, the troops were moved to Camp Lincoln. In September 1862, the camp was moved six miles (10 km) north of the city to a more neutral position further away from the settlers.

During construction of the new location, tensions between the whites and the Tolowa rose even further. Many of the whites wanted the government to evict the Tolowa, but the government did no such action and they began to take matters into their own hands. Settlers burned crops and harassed the Tolowa, who were told to get out or be killed. Approximately 500 Tolowa decided to leave, and the remaining 1,500 stayed only because the Army promised to keep the peace.

Although no truce was reached, after the Civil War, the Army could not afford to staff many small posts, and the camp was abandoned in June 1869 and closed for good in May 1870.

Commanding officer's quarters and one barracks remained when the site was declared California Historical Landmark #545 in 1962.

== Camp Lincoln wasn't the originally intended location ==
Historical evidence suggests that the original intention of the Bureau of Indian Affairs was to have the Settlers defended from a location other than Camp Lincoln. It appears that GEO. M. HANSON, Superintendent Indian Affairs had another spot in mind. He wrote a letter on July 2, 1862, to Brig. Gen. George Wright requesting that troops be sent to defend the settlers at Crescent City. However, in his letter he mentions a 160-acre (0.65 km^{2}) parcel of land loosely known as Fort Dick (later referred to as Russell's Prairie) to be an adequate site to defend the settlers. This letter caused First Lieutenant and Regimental Quartermaster W.F. Swasey to be sent a very long distance to evaluate the site of Fort Dick. In his letter, he too recommends it as a good spot. It's not until a third letter arrives from Major James F. Curtis, that he indicates that Camp Lincoln is far superior of a choice and that his inspection of the "Russell place" (Fort Dick) found that it was subject to flooding. That sealed the deal and Camp Lincoln won out over Fort Dick.

All three letters were published by the United States Department of War in 1897, but digitized by the University of Virginia in 2008. The letters appear in Volume L of the multi volume series "The War of the Rebellion".

Office Indian Affairs, Northern Dist. California, San Francisco, July 2, 1862. Brig. Gen. George Wright:

Sir: I am just in receipt of information from the Smith River Valley that the troops sent thither have crossed the river and are about settling camp almost in the midst of the Indians, or at least about half way between the two largest tribes, or say half mile from one tribe and a mile from the others. I hope you will order the troops on the south side of the river to be stationed at or near a place called Fort Dick, where U. S. laud and good water can be found in abundance. This will be two-thirds of the distance from Crescent City to the reservation, and serve as protection both to the whites and Indians, who will thereby be kept entirely separate. 1 have the honor to be, &c.,

GEO. M. HANSON, Superintendent Indian Affairs, <&c.

The second letter written regarding the topic of the site of a fort to protect the settlers came a mere 7 days later. On July 9, 1862. W. F. SWASEY, First Lieutenant and Regimental Quartermaster (Second Infantry California Volunteers) sent a very lengthy letter to Col. F. J. Lippitt at the Headquarters of the District Of Humboldt recommending that the site be that of Fort Dick, CA. Although, not an official US Military Outpost, it was being used by local settlers to defend themselves from the attacks they faced by the Tolowa and Yurok tribes. In his letter, Lieutenant W.F. Swasey goes into great detail about the site and its alternate names, including that of "Russell's Prairie". This name is briefly mentioned in yet a third letter that actually confirms the selection of Camp Lincoln as the site for the permanent military presence to defend the settlers.

On September 15, 1862, a letter was sent to Lieut. Col. R. C. Drum. The letter was sent by JAMES F. CURTIS, Major Second Infantry California Volunteers, Commanding Camp Lincoln, Humboldt Military District. In his letter he describes many things. One thing that is very easy to look over is a mere sentence near the end of the letter where he describes why he selected Camp Lincoln over Fort Dick (Russell's Prairie).

Asst. Adjt. Gen., Hdqrs. Dept. of the Pacific, San Francisco, Cal.-: Sir : I have the honor to report that in accordance with instructions from district headquarters I assumed the command of the U. S. troops in Smith's River Valley on 11th instant, and on the following day removed the command (Captain Stuart's company (G), Second Infantry California Volunteers) six miles south of Smith's River, equally distant from Crescent City, still to the south. The camp is upon dry, sloping ground, an opening in a redwood forest, and upon the main road between Crescent City and the Indian reservation, and where it is intersected by the Yreka and Jacksonville turnpike. Communication with the steam-ship landing will always be open over a good road, and we are sufficiently near Crescent City to afford that town protection from the powerful tribe of Klamaths, as well as from the reservation Indians. Good water, wood, and grazing in abundance. The point has the approval of Mr. Hanson, Indian agent. The name Camp Lincoln is retained and the post-office address not changed. Before selecting this site I examined the proposed Russell place and found it entirely unfit for a camp in consequence of its liability to overflow. During the past winter there was but a single knoll above water there, and that not one-half the area of the plaza of San Francisco.

All of which is submitted for the consideration of the general commanding.

Very respectfully, your obedient servant, JAMES F. CURTIS, Major Second Infantry California Volunteers, Commanding.
