= Cody Hoffman =

American football player (born 1991)

No. 87, 83
- Position: Wide receiver

Personal information
- Born: March 13, 1991 (age 35); Crescent City, California, U.S.
- Listed height: 6 ft 4 in (1.93 m)
- Listed weight: 210 lb (95 kg)

Career information
- High school: Del Norte (Crescent City)
- College: BYU
- NFL draft: 2014: undrafted

Career history
- Washington Redskins (2014)*; Montreal Alouettes (2015–2016); Ottawa Redblacks (2017)
- * Offseason or practice squad member only

Awards and highlights
- First-team All-Independent (2011, 2012)
- Stats at CFL.ca

Cody Taylor Hoffman (born March 13, 1991) is an American former professional football player who was a wide receiver in the National Football League (NFL). He signed as an un-drafted free agent with the Washington Redskins in 2014. He played college football for the BYU Cougars. Following the 2012 season, he was recognized as an All-American honorable mention.

== Early life ==
Hoffman attended Del Norte High School, where on the football team he was a three-year starter, was named to the Humboldt-Del Norte Big 5 All-conference team three times, and member of the league champions in 2006 and 2007. As a senior, he caught 50 passes for over 1,000 yards with seven 100-yard receiving games. Hoffman was only given 2-stars by the main recruiting services, and received little recruiting interest and garnering only two scholarship offers (to BYU and Sacramento State).

== College career ==
=== Freshman season (2010) ===
After spending his redshirt season as a member of the scout team Hoffman became a starter in 2010 and led the team with 527 receiving yards on 42 receptions with 7 touchdowns. He also had 380 yards on kick returns.

=== Sophomore season (2011) ===
Hoffman played and started in all 13 games of the 2011 season, leading the team with 61 catches, 943 yards, 10 touchdowns, 879 yards on 26 kick returns (both BYU single season records), and 1825 all-purpose yards. He was named to Phil Steele All-Independent First-team, Yahoo! Sports All-Independent Team and FBS All-Independent Team.

=== Junior Season (2012) ===
In 2012, Hoffman was named a SI.com All-America honorable mention, Phil Steele All-Independent First-team, FBS All-Independent Team, and Bilentnikoff Award Watch List. He started in all 13 games and led BYU with 100 receptions, 1248 yards, and 11 touchdowns. He had a school record five touchdown receptions against New Mexico State with a career-high 182 yards. Hoffman was projected as a second- or third-round pick in the 2013 NFL draft, but opted to remain at BYU for his senior season.

=== Senior Season (2013) ===
In 2013, Hoffman was a Phil Steele Preseason All-American and named to the 2013 CFPA Wide Receiver Trophy and Biletnikoff Award watch lists. He became the BYU all-time reception leader, touchdown leader, and receiving yards leader.

== College career statistics ==
All statistics from Brigham Young Official Athletic Site,

Year	Team	Games Played	Receptions	Yards	Average	TDs	Kickoff Returns	Yards	Average	TDs
2009	BYU	0	0	N/A	0	0	0	0	N/A	0
2010	BYU	13	42	527	12.5	7	14	380	27.1	0
2011	BYU	13	61	943	15.5	10	36	879	24.4	1
2012	BYU	13	100	1248	12.5	11	3	72	24.0	0
2013	BYU	10	45	727	16.2	5	0	0	N/A	0
College totals		49	248	3445	13.9	33	53	1331	25.1	1

== Professional career ==
=== 2014 NFL Combine ===
Pre-draft measurables
Height	Weight	Arm length	Hand span	40-yard dash	20-yard shuttle	Three-cone drill	Vertical jump	Broad jump	Bench press
6 ft 4 in (1.93 m)	223 lb (101 kg)	33 1/4 in (0.84 m)	9 3/4 in (0.25 m)	4.65 s	4.20 s	6.89 s	27.5 in (0.70 m)	9 ft 0 in (2.74 m)	13 reps
All values from NFL Combine.

=== Washington Redskins ===
After going undrafted in the 2014 NFL draft, Hoffman signed as an un-drafted free agent with the Washington Redskins. He was waived on August 24, 2014.

=== Montreal Alouettes ===
On February 20, 2015, Hoffman was signed by the Montreal Alouettes of the Canadian Football League to a two-year contract. Hoffman played four games in 2015 for the Alouettes, catching 6 passes for 104 yards and 1 touchdown. In May 2016, Hoffman failed to pass a physical, and was released. He was re-signed by the Als in late July 2016. Hoffman only dressed for one game in the 2016 season, and was subsequently released on January 11, 2017.

=== Ottawa Redblacks ===
On July 4, 2017 Hoffman signed with the Ottawa Redblacks (CFL).
