= Wendell Wood =

American writer (1949–2015)

Wendell Wood (November 15, 1949 – August 11, 2015) was an American environmental activist and educator who co-founded Oregon Wild, a conservation organization headquartered in Portland.

Wood campaigned for the protection of fish and other wildlife in the Klamath Basin, a region of Oregon and California drained by the Klamath River, during disputes over water use and the proposed construction of a ski resort in the area. He spearheaded efforts to gain protection for two native Klamath Basin fish species, the Lost River sucker and the shortnose sucker, under the Endangered Species Act. He also campaigned for the protection of the western snowy plover.

Wood declined an offer to work at his family's furniture factory in Los Angeles, California. Instead, Wood moved to Oregon in 1976 to teach biology at a high school in Myrtle Creek. In 1981, Wood relocated to Eugene to take a position with the Oregon Natural Resources Council, which changed its name to Oregon Wild in 2005. He worked pro bono for the organization for three years before receiving his first paycheck.

Wood published his book, A Walking Guide to Oregon's Ancient Forest, in 1991. The book began a political fight over the use of forests in the Pacific Northwest, which ultimately led to the adoption of the Northwest Forest Plan by the Clinton administration in 1994. The plan provided protection for the northern spotted owl, a species threatened by logging.

Wood suffered a heart attack while hiking in Prairie Creek Redwoods State Park in Humboldt County, California, on August 11, 2015. He died en route to the hospital at the age of 65. He was a resident of Crescent City, California, where he had moved for retirement. He was survived by his wife, Kathy.
