= Louis DeMartin =

Louis Peter DeMartin (1839 – July 21, 1907) was a Swiss-born pioneer of Del Norte County, California.

He was born in Ticino, Switzerland, in and came to the United States around 1854. He married Agnes O'Grady of New York in 1869. In 1877, they purchased 200 acres (0.81 km^{2}) at False Klamath Cove and Wilson Creek and moved up from Eureka, where they owned the Revere Hotel. The first home at Wilson Creek was a log cabin. In 1889, DeMartin built a new home which also served as a hostelry. Travelers paid approximately 25 cents for a bed and the same for a meal. Louis DeMartin is buried in Crescent City, California. The Highway 101 bridge crossing Wilson Creek is named in his honor. It was dedicated October 20, 1957.
