= 2011 BYU Cougars football team =

American college football season

2011 BYU Cougars football

Armed Forces Bowl champion

Armed Forces Bowl, W 24–21 vs. Tulsa
- Conference: Independent

Ranking
- Coaches: No. 25
- Record: 10–3
- Head coach: Bronco Mendenhall (7th season)
- Offensive coordinator: Brandon Doman (1st season)
- Offensive scheme: West Coast
- Base defense: 3–4
- Captains: Jameson Frazier; Bryan Kariya; Matt Reynolds; Travis Uale
- Home stadium: LaVell Edwards Stadium

2011 NCAA Division I FBS independents football records
	Conf.			Overall
Team	W		L	W		L
BYU		–		10	–	3
Notre Dame		–		8	–	5
Navy		–		5	–	7
Army		–		3	–	9
Rankings from AP Poll

The 2011 BYU Cougars football team represented Brigham Young University in the 2011 NCAA Division I FBS football season. The Cougars, led by head coach Bronco Mendenhall, played their home games at LaVell Edwards Stadium. This was the first year they competed as an independent in football. They finished the season 10–3 and were invited to the Armed Forces Bowl where they defeated Tulsa 24–21.

== 2011 media ==
The school announced that the annual BYU Football Media days would be July 12, 2011 and would be broadcast live on BYUtv. Special question and answer segments with current players and BYU Hall of Famers would take place throughout the day on BYUtv.org. Having no other sports to broadcast that day, ESPN announced they would simulcast two of the events live on ESPN3. All games will be broadcast on KSL 102.7 FM and 1160 AM, on the internet at KSL.com, and through the various BYU Cougars sport network affiliates. Additionally BYUtv will broadcast a one-hour pregame show live (called Countdown to Kickoff and hosted by Dave McCann, Alema Harrington, and David Nixon) followed by a Post-game Show with Interviews from players and coaches about the games outcome. The Bronco Mendenhall Monday Press Conference will be shown live every Monday on www.byutv.org (live events link) instead of the actual BYUtv Channel. BYUtv Sports will also be able to provide their own announcers for the BYUtv Gameday Replay of all home games with Dave McCann doing play-by-play, Gary Sheide or Blaine Fowler doing color commentary, and Robbie Bullough or Jarom Jordan doing sideline reporting.

=== BYU Radio Sports Network Affiliates ===
KSL 102.7 FM and 1160 AM – Flagship Station (Salt Lake City/ Provo, UT and ksl.com)
BYU Radio – Nationwide (Dish Network 980, Sirius XM 143, and byuradio.org)
KIDO – Boise, ID [football only]
KTHK – Blackfoot/ Idaho Falls/ Pocatello/ Rexburg, ID
KMGR – Manti, UT
KSUB – Cedar City, UT
KDXU – St. George, UT
KSHP – Las Vegas, NV [football only]
KNZZ – Grand Junction, CO [football only]

== Schedule ==
Date	Time	Opponent	Site	TV	Result	Attendance
September 3	2:45 p.m.	at Ole Miss	Vaught–Hemingway Stadium; Oxford, Mississippi	ESPN	W 14–13	55,124
September 10	5:00 p.m.	at No. 24 Texas	Darrell K Royal–Texas Memorial Stadium; Austin, Texas	ESPN2	L 16–17	100,995
September 17	7:15 p.m.	Utah	LaVell Edwards Stadium; Provo, Utah (Holy War)	ESPN2	L 10–54	63,742
September 23	6:00 p.m.	UCF	LaVell Edwards Stadium; Provo, Utah	ESPN	W 24–17	59,874
September 30	6:00 p.m.	Utah State	LaVell Edwards Stadium; Provo, Utah (Beehive Boot, Old Wagon Wheel)	ESPN	W 27–24	63,513
October 8	8:15 p.m.	San Jose State^{†}	LaVell Edwards Stadium; Provo, Utah	ESPNU	W 29–16	59,782
October 15	2:00 p.m.	at Oregon State	Reser Stadium; Corvallis, Oregon	KBYU/FCS Pacific	W 38–28	42,584
October 22	1:00 p.m.	Idaho State	LaVell Edwards Stadium; Provo, Utah	BYUtv	W 56–3	60,043
October 28	6:00 p.m.	vs. TCU	Cowboys Stadium; Arlington, Texas	ESPN	L 28–38	50,094
November 12	7:15 p.m.	Idaho	LaVell Edwards Stadium; Provo, Utah	ESPN2	W 42–7	57,770
November 19	8:15 p.m.	New Mexico State	LaVell Edwards Stadium; Provo, Utah	ESPNU	W 42–7	57,134
December 3	5:30 p.m.	at Hawaii	Aloha Stadium; Honolulu, Hawaii	ESPN2	W 41–20	34,446
December 30	10:00 a.m.	vs. Tulsa	Gerald J. Ford Stadium; University Park, TX (Armed Forces Bowl)	ESPN	W 24–21	30,258
^{†}Homecoming; Rankings from AP Poll released prior to the game; All times are in Mountain time

== Roster ==
2011 BYU Cougars
Quarterbacks: 3 James Lark – Junior; 7 Alex Kuresa – Freshman; 9 Jake Heaps – Sophomore; 12 Jason Munns – Sophomore; 13 Riley Nelson – Junior; Running backs: 5 Iona Pritchard – Sophomore; 10 JJ Di Luigi – Senior; 20 Josh Quezada – Sophomore; 22 Adam Hine – Freshman; 27 David Foote – Junior; 30 Ryan Folsom – Sophomore; 32 Nate Carter – Freshman; 33 Bryan Kariya – Senior; 35 Zed Mendenhall – Junior; 41 Austin Heder – Freshman; 42 Michael Alisa – Sophomore; Offensive line: 50 Ryan Freeman – Junior; 54 Blair Tushaus – Freshman; 57 Famika Anae – Freshman; 60 Terence Brown – Senior; 62 Marco Thorson – Senior; 64 Terrance Motley – Freshman; 66 Manu Mulitalo – Freshman; 67 Quinn Lawlor – Freshman; 68 Austin Nielsen – Junior; 70 Matt Reynolds – Senior; 72 Ryker Mathews – Freshman; 73 Solomone Kafu – Freshman; 74 Brock Stringham – Freshman; 75 Braden Brown – Junior; 76 Braden Hansen – Junior; 77 Michael Yeck – Freshman; 78 Houston Reynolds – Sophomore; 79 Manaaki Vaitai – Sophomore; Devon smith – Freshman; Coaches: Bronco Mendenhall – Head coach/ defensive coordinator; Lance Reynolds – Asst. Head Coach/ tight ends; Brandon Doman – Offensive coordinator/ quarterbacks coach; Ben Cahoon – Receivers coach; Joe DuPaix – Running backs coach/ recruiting coordinator; Nick Howell – Secondary/ special teams coach; Steve Kaufusi – Defensive line coach; Kelly Poppinga – Outside linebackers coach; Paul Tidwell – Inside linebackers coach; Mark Weber – Offensive line coach; Jay Omer – Head strength and conditioning coach; Duane Busby – Director of football operations; Patrick Hickman – Football h. s. relations coordinator	Wide receivers: 2 Cody Hoffman – Sophomore; 6 McKay Jacobson – Senior; 11 Ross Apo – Freshman; 12 JD Falslev – Sophomore; 16 Terenn Houk – Freshman; 17 Dalin Tollestrup – Junior; 19 Matt Marshall – Senior; 21 Kurt Hendersen – Freshman; 23 Cody Raymond – Freshman; 24 Skyler Ridley – Sophomore; 25 Rex Morgan – Freshman; 26 Colby Hansen – Freshman; 29 Jordan Smith – Sophomore; 83 Spencer Hafoka – Senior; 85 Dallin Cutler – Sophomore; 87 Rhen Brown – Junior; Tight ends: 18 Richard Wilson – Sophomore; 80 Marcus Mathews – Sophomore; 82 Kaneakua Friel – Sophomore; 84 Devin Mahina – Sophomore; 86 Colby Jorgensen – Freshman; 88 Austin Holt – Sophomore; 89 Matthew Edwards – Senior; 90 Stehly Reden – Freshman; 92 Grant Jones – Freshman; 93 Trevor Brown – Freshman; Defensive line: 41 Matt Putnam – Senior; 43 Baker Pritchard – Freshman; 55 Eathyn Manumaleuna – Junior; 57 Moses Kaumatule – Freshman; 58 Justin Blackmore – Freshman; 65 Ian Dulan – Senior; 71 Walter Kahaiali'i – Junior; 91 Hebron Fangupo – Senior; 92 Graham Rowley – Sophomore; 93 Simote Vea – Senior; 94 Jordan Richardson – Junior; 95 Mike Muehlmann – Sophomore; 97 Travis Tuiloma – Freshman; 98 Romney Fuga – Junior; Deep Snapper: 96 Reed Hornung – Junior	Linebackers: 1 Jordan Pendleton – Senior; 2 Spencer Hadley – Sophomore; 3 Kyle Van Noy – Sophomore; 4 Uona Kaveinga – Junior; 22 Manoa Pikula – Freshman; 31 Aveni Leung-Wai – Senior; 34 Austen Jorgensen – Junior; 36 Alani Fua – Freshman; 37 Uani Unga – Junior; 38 Seth Probert – Freshman; 39 Zac Stout – Sophomore; 42 Zach Newman – Freshman; 44 Brandon Ogletree – Junior; 45 Tyler Beck – Junior; 46 Kevan Bills – Freshman; 47 Ezekiel Ansah – Junior; 48 Jameson Frazier – Senior; 49 Jadon Wagner – Senior; 51 Lene Lesatele – Freshman; 52 Cody Monsen – Freshman; 53 Tanner Cox – Freshman; 56 Connell Hess – Junior; 59 Va'a Niumatalolo – Freshman; Defensive backs: 5 Joe Sampson – Junior; 6 Jordan Johnson – Freshman; 7 Preston Hadley – Junior; 9 Daniel Sorensen – Sophomore; 15 Carter Mees – Junior; 16 Gavin Fowler – Freshman; 17 Logan Obering – Freshman; 18 Jray Galea'i – Sophomore; 19 Kori Gaines – Freshman; 20 Chase Pendley – Sophomore; 21 DeQuan Everett – Junior; 23 Travis Uale – Senior; 24 Cameron Comer – Freshman; 25 Corby Eason – Senior; 26 Robbie Buckner – Junior; 27 Teu Kautai – Freshman; 29 Skye PoVey – Sophomore; 32 Mike Hague – Junior; Kickers/ Punters: 28 Brian Smith – Sophomore; 37 Justin Sorensen – Sophomore; 99 Riley Stephenson – Junior

== Rankings ==
Ranking movements Legend: ██ Increase in ranking ██ Decrease in ranking — = Not ranked RV = Received votes
	Week															
Poll	Pre	1	2	3	4	5	6	7	8	9	10	11	12	13	14	Final
AP	RV/ 33	RV/ 32	RV/ 33	—	—	—	—	—	RV/ 36	—	—	—	—	RV/ 31	RV/ 29	RV/ 26
Coaches	RV/ 43	RV/ 44	RV/ 42	—	—	—	—	—	RV/ 34	—	—	RV/ 35	RV/ 30	RV/ 28	RV/ 26	25
Harris	Not released						—	—	RV	RV	—	RV	RV	RV	RV	Not released
BCS	Not released							—	—	—	—	—	—	—	—	Not released

== Regular season ==
=== Mississippi ===
BYU's first game as a football independent.

BYU at Ole Miss

Team	1	2	3	4	Total
• Cougars	0	0	0	14	14
Rebels	0	3	7	3	13

- Date: September 3
- Location: Oxford, MS
- Game start: 2:45 pm MDT
- Elapsed time: 3:06
- Game attendance: 55,124
- Game weather: 89 °F (32 °C), Fair, winds SE 5 mph
- Referee: Marc Curles
- TV announcers (ESPN/Touchdown Radio): Bob Wischusen, Bob Davie, and Jessica Mendoza (ESPN)
  Frank Fangie, Gino Torretta, and Roxy Bernstein (Touchdown Radio)

Scoring summary

Quarter	Time	Drive			Team	Scoring information	Score	
Quarter	Time	Plays	Yards	TOP	Team	Scoring information	BYU	Mississippi
2	0:49	9	49	2:05	Mississippi	20-yard field goal by Byron Rose	0	3
3	8:34				Mississippi	Interception returned 96 yards for touchdown by Charles Sawyer, Byron Rose kick good	0	10
4	14:15	11	70	4:28	Mississippi	29-yard field goal by Byron Rose	0	13
4	9:52	8	72	4:16	BYU	Ross Apo 19-yard touchdown reception from Jake Heaps, Justin Sorensen kick good	7	13
4	5:09				BYU	Fumble recovery returned 3 yards for touchdown by Kyle Van Noy, Justin Sorensen kick good	14	13
"TOP" = time of possession. For other American football terms, see Glossary of American football.							14	13

=== Texas ===
BYU at No. 21 Texas

Team	1	2	3	4	Total
Cougars	6	7	3	0	16
• #21 Longhorns	0	3	7	7	17

- Date: September 10
- Location: Austin, TX
- Game start: 5:07 pm MDT
- Elapsed time: 3:06
- Game attendance: 100,995
- Game weather: 99 °F (37 °C), sunny, winds NNE 8 mph
- Referee: Dan Romeo
- TV announcers (ESPN2/ESPN 3D/Westwood One): Ed Cunningham, Mark Jones, and Samantha Steele (ESPN2)
  Dave LaMont and Tim Brown (ESPN3D)
  Brian Davis and Eddie George (Westwood One)

Scoring summary

Quarter	Time	Drive			Team	Scoring information	Score	
Quarter	Time	Plays	Yards	TOP	Team	Scoring information	BYU	Texas
1	9:33	10	45	4:02	BYU	30-yard field goal by Justin Sorensen	3	0
1	6:45	5	21	1:49	BYU	33-yard field goal by Justin Sorensen	6	0
2	11:41	12	97	5:04	BYU	Ross Apo 6-yard touchdown reception from Jake Heaps, Justin Sorensen kick good	13	0
2	1:44	7	19	3:15	Texas	23-yard field goal by Justin Tucker	13	3
3	10:46	7	62	2:42	Texas	Cody Johnson 1-yard touchdown run, Justin Tucker kick good	13	10
3	4:36	12	56	6:02	BYU	32-yard field goal by Justin Sorensen	16	10
4	8:46	8	52	3:18	Texas	Cody Johnson 1-yard touchdown run, Justin Tucker kick good	16	17
"TOP" = time of possession. For other American football terms, see Glossary of American football.							16	17

=== Utah ===
Utah at BYU

Team	1	2	3	4	Total
• Utes	7	7	16	24	54
Cougars	3	7	0	0	10

- Date: September 17
- Location: Provo, UT
- Game start: 7:21 pm MDT
- Elapsed time: 3:42
- Game attendance: 63,742
- Game weather: 65 °F (18 °C), fair, winds W 2 mph
- Referee: Jack Wood
- TV announcers (ESPN2/BYUtv): Ed Cunningham, Mark Jones, and Jessica Mendoza (ESPN2)
  Dave McCann, Gary Sheide, and Jarom Jordan (BYUtv)

Scoring summary

Quarter	Time	Drive			Team	Scoring information	Score	
Quarter	Time	Plays	Yards	TOP	Team	Scoring information	Utah	BYU
1	13:58				Utah	Fumble recovery returned 0 yards for touchdown by Derrick Shelby, Coleman Petersen kick good	7	0
1	0:09	6	37	1:52	BYU	46-yard field goal by Justin Sorensen	7	3
2	6:23	4	66	1:59	BYU	Ross Apo 32-yard touchdown reception from Jake Heaps, Justin Sorensen kick good	7	10
2	0:32	6	63	2:11	Utah	Jake Murphy 30-yard touchdown reception from Jordan Wynn, Coleman Petersen kick good	14	10
3	12:14	6	75	2:46	Utah	Dres Anderson 59-yard touchdown reception from Jordan Wynn, Coleman Petersen kick good	21	10
3	9:11	5	19	1:51	Utah	39-yard field goal by Coleman Petersen	24	10
3	8:32	2	3	0:36	Utah	John White 1-yard touchdown run, Coleman Petersen kick no good	30	10
4	14:51	4	3	1:30	Utah	20-yard field goal by Coleman Petersen	33	10
4	9:25	2	82	0:42	Utah	John White 62-yard touchdown run, Coleman Petersen kick good	40	10
4	8:06	1	35	0:08	Utah	John White 35-yard touchdown run, Coleman Petersen kick good	47	10
4	3:38				Utah	Fumble recovery returned 57 yards for touchdown by V.J. Fehoko, Coleman Petersen kick good	54	10
"TOP" = time of possession. For other American football terms, see Glossary of American football.							54	10

=== Central Florida ===
UCF at BYU

Team	1	2	3	4	Total
Golden Knights	10	0	7	0	17
• Cougars	3	0	14	7	24

- Date: September 23
- Location: Provo, UT
- Game start: 6:06 pm
- Elapsed time: 3:10
- Game attendance: 59,874
- Game weather: 81 °F (27 °C), sunny, winds S 3 mph
- Referee: Wayne Winkler
- TV announcers (ESPN/BYUtv): Joe Tessitore, and Rod Gilmore (ESPN)
  Dave McCann, Blaine Fowler, and Robbie Bullough (BYUtv)

Scoring summary

Quarter	Time	Drive			Team	Scoring information	Score	
Quarter	Time	Plays	Yards	TOP	Team	Scoring information	UCF	BYU
1	9:58	10	63	5:02	UCF	34-yard field goal by Nick Cattoi	3	0
1	6:19	11	54	3:32	BYU	37-yard field goal by Justin Sorensen	3	3
1	0:00	3	17	1:28	UCF	Jeff Godfrey 10-yard touchdown run, Nick Cattoi kick good	10	7
3	8:13	5	38	2:11	BYU	JJ Di Liuigi 16-yard touchdown run, Justin Sorensen kick good	10	10
3	4:50	7	84	3:14	UCF	Jeff Godfrey 1-yard touchdown run, Nick Cattoi kick good	17	10
3	4:37				BYU	Kickoff returned 93 yards for touchdown by Cody Hoffman, Justin Sorensen kick good	17	17
4	10:29	3	23	1:20	BYU	Brian Kariya 6-yard touchdown run, Justin Sorensen kick good	17	24
"TOP" = time of possession. For other American football terms, see Glossary of American football.							17	24

=== Utah State ===
Utah State at BYU

Team	1	2	3	4	Total
USU Aggies	7	7	7	3	24
• Cougars	10	3	0	14	27

- Date: September 30
- Location: Provo, UT
- Game start: 6:05 pm
- Elapsed time: 3:16
- Game attendance: 63,513
- Game weather: 85 °F (29 °C), clear, winds SE 5 mph
- Referee: Bill Athan
- TV announcers (ESPN/BYUtv): Joe Tessitore, and Rod Gilmore (ESPN)
  Dave McCann, Gary Sheide, and Jarom Jordan (BYUtv)

Scoring summary

Quarter	Time	Drive			Team	Scoring information	Score	
Quarter	Time	Plays	Yards	TOP	Team	Scoring information	Utah State	BYU
1	14:46	1	80	:14	Utah State	Robert Turbin 80-yard touchdown run, Josh Thompson kick good	7	0
1	8:05	16	69	6:37	BYU	23-yard field goal by Justin Sorensen	7	3
1	1:47	10	47	4:43	BYU	Jake Heaps 1-yard touchdown run, Justin Sorensen kick good	7	10
2	4:02	13	78	4:01	Utah State	Eric Moats 13-yard touchdown reception from Chuckie Keeton, Josh Thompson kick good	14	10
2	0:55	10	62	3:07	BYU	23-yard field goal by Justin Sorensen	14	13
3	8:37	12	89	4:49	Utah State	Robert Turbin 24-yard touchdown reception from Chuckie Keeton, Josh Thompson kick good	21	13
4	12:43	12	66	4:55	Utah State	21-yard field goal by Josh Thompson	24	13
4	10:05	8	60	2:38	BYU	Cody Hoffman 24-yard touchdown reception from Riley Nelson, Justin Sorensen kick good	24	20
4	0:11	9	96	2:25	BYU	Marcus Mathews 13-yard touchdown reception from Riley Nelson, Justin Sorensen kick good	24	27
"TOP" = time of possession. For other American football terms, see Glossary of American football.							24	27

=== San Jose State ===
San Jose State at BYU

Team	1	2	3	4	Total
Spartans	3	3	7	3	16
• Cougars	9	14	3	3	29

- Date: October 8
- Location: Provo, UT
- Game start: 8:17 pm
- Elapsed time: 2:50
- Game attendance: 59,782
- Game weather: 48 °F (9 °C), Partly Cloudy, winds ESE 1 mph
- Referee: Stacy Hardin
- TV announcers (ESPNU/BYUtv): Adam Amin, and David Diaz-Infante (ESPNU)
  Dave McCann, Blaine Fowler, and Jarom Jordan (BYUtv)

Scoring summary

Quarter	Time	Drive			Team	Scoring information	Score	
Quarter	Time	Plays	Yards	TOP	Team	Scoring information	San Jose State	BYU
1	9:09				BYU	San Jose State snapped ball out of end zone	0	2
1	7:04	5	56	2:05	BYU	Richard Wilson 21-yard touchdown reception from Riley Nelson, Justin Sorensen kick good	0	9
1	:17	13	73	6:47	San Jose State	24-yard field goal by Jens Alvernik	3	9
2	10:58	9	75	4:19	BYU	Bryan Kariya 1-yard touchdown reception from Riley Nelson, Justin Sorensen kick good	3	16
2	8:49	1	40	:08	BYU	McKay Jacobson 40-yard touchdown reception from Riley Nelson, Justin Sorensen kick good	3	23
2	:03	10	76	3:49	San Jose State	40-yard field goal by Jens Alvernik	6	23
3	6:09	12	96	5:28	San Jose State	Jason Simpson 1-yard touchdown run, Jens Alvernik kick good	13	23
3	:32	10	28	5:37	BYU	42-yard field goal by Justin Sorensen	13	26
4	10:41	11	52	4:51	San Jose State	43-yard field goal by Jens Alvernik	16	26
4	7:23	9	45	3:18	BYU	45-yard field goal by Justin Sorensen	16	29
"TOP" = time of possession. For other American football terms, see Glossary of American football.							16	29

=== Oregon State ===
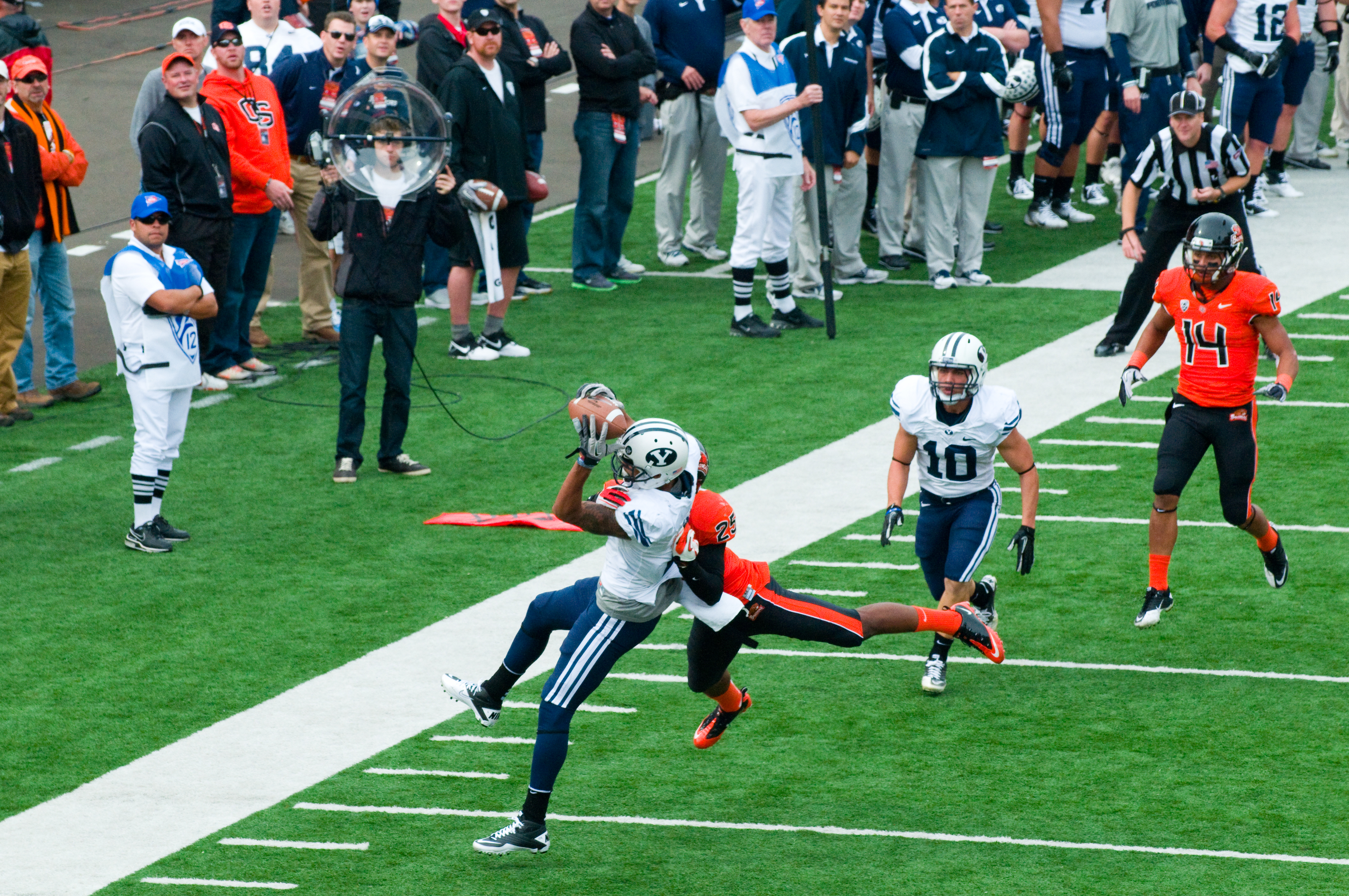
BYU wide receiver making a catch at Reser Stadium in Corvallis, Oregon in a 2011 game against Oregon State, which the Cougars won 38–28

BYU at Oregon State

Team	1	2	3	4	Total
• Cougars	7	7	10	14	38
Beavers	0	14	7	7	28

- Date: October 15
- Location: Corvallis, OR
- Game start: 2:10 pm
- Elapsed time: 3:10
- Game attendance: 42,584
- Game weather: 63 °F (17 °C), Partly Cloudy, winds W 2 mph
- Referee: Reggie Smith
- TV announcers (FCS Pacific, KBYU): Dave McCann, Mike Lamb, and Robbie Bullough

Scoring summary

Quarter	Time	Drive			Team	Scoring information	Score	
Quarter	Time	Plays	Yards	TOP	Team	Scoring information	BYU	Oregon State
1	5:02	12	82	7:28	BYU	Michael Alisa 10-yard touchdown run, Justin Sorensen kick good	7	0
2	9:23	9	50	4:48	BYU	JJ Di Luigi 3-yard touchdown run, Justin Sorensen kick good	14	0
2	3:51	11	72	5:32	Oregon State	Sean Mannion 1-yard touchdown run, Trevor Romaine kick good	14	7
2	1:38				Oregon State	Interception returned 51 yards for touchdown by Jordan Poyer, Trevor Romaine kick good	14	14
3	11:16	7	80	3:44	BYU	Cody Hoffman 12-yard touchdown reception from Riley Nelson, Justin Sorensen kick good	21	14
3	3:26	5	20	1:41	BYU	33-yard field goal by Justin Sorensen	24	14
3	2:08	3	77	1:18	Oregon State	Brandin Cooks 59-yard touchdown reception from Sean Mannion, Trevor Romaine kick good	24	21
4	10:39	12	66	6:29	BYU	JD Falslev 2-yard touchdown reception from Riley Nelson, Justin Sorensen kick good	31	21
4	3:37	6	69	3:32	BYU	Kaneakua Friel 8-yard touchdown reception from Riley Nelson, Justin Sorensen kick good	38	21
4	:23	15	73	3:14	Oregon State	Jovan Stevenson 2-yard touchdown run, Trevor Romaine kick good	38	28
"TOP" = time of possession. For other American football terms, see Glossary of American football.							38	28

=== Idaho State ===
Idaho State at BYU

Team	1	2	3	4	Total
Bengals	3	0	0	0	3
• Cougars	14	21	14	7	56

- Date: October 22
- Location: Provo, UT
- Game start: 1:06 pm
- Elapsed time: 3:04
- Game attendance: 60,043
- Game weather: 61 °F (16 °C), Sunny with High Clouds, winds S 3 mph
- Referee: Rick Loumiet
- TV announcers (BYUtv): Dave McCann, Blaine Fowler, and Robbie Bullough

Scoring summary

Quarter	Time	Drive			Team	Scoring information	Score	
Quarter	Time	Plays	Yards	TOP	Team	Scoring information	Idaho State	BYU
1	12:16	1	15	:07	BYU	Ross Apo 15-yard touchdown reception from Riley Nelson, Justin Sorensen kick good	0	7
1	5:09	19	63	7:07	Idaho State	34-yard field goal by Brendon Garcia	3	7
1	3:35	4	60	1:27	BYU	Michael Alisa 42-yard touchdown run, Justin Sorensen kick good	3	14
2	8:23	7	50	3:31	BYU	JJ Di Luigi 12-yard touchdown run, Justin Sorensen kick good	3	21
2	3:57	7	79	2:50	BYU	Riley Nelson 16-yard touchdown run, Justin Sorensen kick good	3	28
2	:41	9	99	1:54	BYU	Cody Hoffman 7-yard touchdown reception from Riley Nelson, Justin Sorensen kick good	3	35
3	10:36	6	91	3:11	BYU	Cody Hoffman 19-yard touchdown reception from Riley Nelson, Justin Sorensen kick good	3	42
3	2:26				BYU	Interception returned 30 yards for touchdown by Daniel Sorensen, Justin Sorensen kick good	3	49
4	6:46	7	64	3:30	BYU	Joshua Quezada 8-yard touchdown run, Justin Sorensen kick good	3	56
"TOP" = time of possession. For other American football terms, see Glossary of American football.							3	56

=== TCU ===
BYU vs. TCU from Cowboys Stadium

Team	1	2	3	4	Total
Cougars	10	0	10	8	28
• Horned Frogs	14	14	7	3	38

- Date: October 28
- Location: Arlington, TX
- Game start: 6:05 pm
- Elapsed time: 3:34
- Game attendance: 50,094
- Game weather: 58 °F (14 °C), clear, winds WNW 4 mph
- Referee: Cooper Castleberry
- TV announcers (ESPN/ESPN Radio): Joe Tessitore, Rod Gilmore, and Samantha Steele (ESPN)
  Bill Rosinski, David Norrie, and Joe Schad (ESPN Radio)

Scoring summary

Quarter	Time	Drive			Team	Scoring information	Score	
Quarter	Time	Plays	Yards	TOP	Team	Scoring information	BYU	TCU
1	14:15	2	61	:45	TCU	Skye Dawson 48-yard touchdown reception from Casey Pachall, Ross Evans kick good	0	7
1	10:06	2	8	:41	TCU	Matt Brown 6-yard touchdown run, Ross Evans kick good	0	14
1	7:14	7	44	2:52	BYU	42-yard field goal by Justin Sorensen	3	14
1	2:28	9	76	3:09	BYU	Michael Alisa 22-yard touchdown reception from Riley Nelson, Justin Sorensen kick good	10	14
2	6:57	3	37	1:09	TCU	Matt Brown 2-yard touchdown run, Ross Evans kick good	10	21
2	:36	2	45	:32	TCU	Josh Boyce 33-yard touchdown reception from Casey Pachall, Ross Evans kick good	10	28
3	8:36	4	38	1:40	TCU	Waymon James 4-yard touchdown run, Ross Evans kick good	10	35
3	4:13	9	44	4:23	BYU	44-yard field goal by Justin Sorensen	13	35
3	2:20				BYU	Punt returned 67 yards for touchdown by JD Falslev, Justin Sorensen kick good	20	35
4	5:32	13	54	6:48	TCU	35-yard field goal by Ross Evans	20	38
4	2:01	12	78	3:31	BYU	Bryan Kariya 1-yard touchdown run, 2-point run (Riley Nelson) good	28	38
"TOP" = time of possession. For other American football terms, see Glossary of American football.							28	38

=== Idaho ===
Idaho at BYU

Team	1	2	3	4	Total
Vandals	0	0	7	0	7
• Cougars	14	14	14	0	42

- Date: November 12
- Location: Provo, UT
- Game start: 7:21 pm
- Elapsed time: 3:14
- Game attendance: 57,770
- Game weather: 37 °F (3 °C), Cloudy, winds WNW 15 mph
- Referee: Mike Defee
- TV announcers (ESPN2/BYUtv): Dave LaMont and Tim Brown (ESPN2)
  Dave McCann, Gary Sheide, and Robbie Bullough (BYUtv)

Scoring summary

Quarter	Time	Drive			Team	Scoring information	Score	
Quarter	Time	Plays	Yards	TOP	Team	Scoring information	Idaho	BYU
1	8:26	5	64	1:06	BYU	Cody Hoffman 32-yard touchdown reception from Riley Nelson, Justin Sorensen kick good	0	7
1	1:18	9	78	5:17	BYU	Bryan Kariya 17-yard touchdown run, Justin Sorensen kick good	0	14
2	6:49	13	75	5:49	BYU	Bryan Kariya 1-yard touchdown run, Justin Sorensen kick good	0	21
2	:13	6	70	1:03	BYU	Cody Hoffman 21-yard touchdown reception from Jake Heaps, Justin Sorensen kick good	0	28
3	12:31	3	57	:48	BYU	Michael Alisa 38-yard touchdown run, Justin Sorensen kick good	0	35
3	5:37	3	22	1:22	BYU	Ross Apo 18-yard touchdown reception from Jake Heaps, Justin Sorensen kick good	0	42
3	3:56	3	75	1:41	Idaho	Princeton McCarty 82-yard touchdown run, Trey Farquhar kick good	7	42
"TOP" = time of possession. For other American football terms, see Glossary of American football.							7	42

=== New Mexico State ===
New Mexico State at BYU

Team	1	2	3	4	Total
NMSU Aggies	0	7	0	0	7
• Cougars	7	14	14	7	42

- Date: November 19
- Location: Provo, UT
- Game start: 8:21 pm
- Elapsed time: 3:05
- Game attendance: 57,134
- Game weather: 34 °F (1 °C), Cloudy, winds Calm
- Referee: Jim Farmer
- TV announcers (ESPNU/BYUtv): Adam Amin, and David Diaz-Infante (ESPNU)
  Dave McCann, Gary Sheide, and Robbie Bullough (BYUtv)

Scoring summary

Quarter	Time	Drive			Team	Scoring information	Score	
Quarter	Time	Plays	Yards	TOP	Team	Scoring information	New Mexico State	BYU
1	5:38	12	52	4:38	BYU	Bryan Kariya 4-yard touchdown run, Justin Sorensen kick good	0	7
2	9:40	9	38	4:57	New Mexico State	A. Franklin 3-yard touchdown reception from Matt Christian, Tyler Stampler kick good	7	7
2	3:25	15	90	6:07	BYU	Ross Apo 20-yard touchdown reception from Jake Heaps, Justin Sorensen kick good	7	14
2	:30	6	46	1:44	BYU	Ross Apo 9-yard touchdown reception from Jake Heaps, Justin Sorensen kick good	7	21
3	7:01	9	57	3:09	BYU	Matt Marshall 2-yard touchdown run, Justin Sorensen kick good	7	28
3	3:14	3	40	:34	BYU	Matthew Edwards 9-yard touchdown reception from Jake Heaps, Justin Sorensen kick good	7	35
4	7:30	8	80	3:46	BYU	JD Falslev 27-yard touchdown reception from Jake Heaps, Justin Sorensen kick good	7	42
"TOP" = time of possession. For other American football terms, see Glossary of American football.							7	42

=== Hawaii ===
BYU at Hawaii

Team	1	2	3	4	Total
• Cougars	0	10	28	3	41
Warriors	6	7	0	7	20

- Date: December 3
- Location: Honolulu, HI
- Game start: 5:36 pm
- Elapsed time: 3:27
- Game attendance: 34,446
- Game weather: 86 °F (30 °C), Mostly Cloudy, winds ENE 13 mph
- Referee: Greg Burks
- TV announcers (ESPN2): Carter Blackburn and Brock Huard

Scoring summary

Quarter	Time	Drive			Team	Scoring information	Score	
Quarter	Time	Plays	Yards	TOP	Team	Scoring information	BYU	Hawaii
1	2:55	10	69	4:57	Hawaii	David Graves 1-yard touchdown run, Kenton Chun kick no good	0	6
2	10:22	9	83	4:31	BYU	Ross Apo 22-yard touchdown reception from Riley Nelson, Justin Sorenson kick good	7	6
2	3:41	1	79	:12	Hawaii	Trevor Davis 79-yard touchdown reception from David Graves, Tyler Hadden kick good	7	13
2	:39	11	42	2:58	BYU	33-yard field goal by Justin Sorensen	10	13
3	11:13	9	72	3:47	BYU	Ross Apo 12-yard touchdown reception from Riley Nelson, Justin Sorenson kick good	17	13
3	9:36				BYU	Joe Sampson recovers fumble and returns it 26-yards for touchdown, Justin Sorenson kick good	24	13
3	4:51	7	85	2:47	BYU	Bryan Kariya 1-yard touchdown run, Justin Sorensen kick good	31	13
3	1:10	4	64	2:11	BYU	Cody Hoffman 38-yard touchdown reception from Riley Nelson, Justin Sorenson kick good	38	13
2	9:44	6	34	3:20	BYU	37-yard field goal by Justin Sorensen	41	13
4	5:55	12	85	3:49	Hawaii	Jeremiah Ostrowski 79-yard touchdown reception from Shane Austin, Tyler Hadden kick good	41	20
"TOP" = time of possession. For other American football terms, see Glossary of American football.							41	20

=== Armed Forces Bowl- Tulsa ===
2011 Armed Forces Bowl: BYU vs. Tulsa

Team	1	2	3	4	Total
• Cougars	3	7	7	7	24
Golden Hurricane	7	7	0	7	21

- Date: December 30
- Location: Dallas, TX
- Game start: 10:01
- Elapsed time: 3:21
- Game attendance: 30,258
- Game weather: 55°, Sunny, winds NNW 7mph
- Referee: Shawn Smith
- TV announcers (ESPN/ESPN Radio): Dave Neal, Andre Ware, and Cara Capuano (ESPN)
  Adam Amin, Tim Brown, and Ian Fitzsimmons (ESPN Radio)

Cody Hoffman (BYU) was voted the offensive MVP of the game because of his 3 Touchdown Receptions and Dexter McCoil (Tulsa) was voted the defensive MVP of the game because of his 2 Interceptions. Kyle Van Noy was 2nd in the defensive MVP voting.

Scoring summary

Quarter	Time	Drive			Team	Scoring information	Score	
Quarter	Time	Plays	Yards	TOP	Team	Scoring information	BYU	Tulsa
1	5:09	11	76	4:57	Tulsa	Ricky Johnson 8-yard touchdown reception from G. J. Kinne, Kevin Fitzpatrick kick good	0	7
1	:11	6	26	3:16	BYU	35-yard field goal by Justin Sorensen	3	7
2	8:39	4	86	1:16	Tulsa	Clay Sears 14-yard touchdown reception from G. J. Kinne, Kevin Fitzpatrick kick good	3	14
2	:07	1	17	:13	BYU	Cody Hoffman 17-yard touchdown reception from Riley Nelson, Justin Sorenson kick good	10	14
3	1:34	9	71	3:47	BYU	Cody Hoffman 30-yard touchdown reception from Riley Nelson, Justin Sorenson kick good	17	14
4	10:42	9	58	2:14	Tulsa	Bryan Burnham 30-yard touchdown reception from G. J. Kinne, Kevin Fitzpatrick kick good	17	21
4	:11	12	48	4:07	BYU	Cody Hoffman 2-yard touchdown reception from Riley Nelson, Justin Sorenson kick good	24	21
"TOP" = time of possession. For other American football terms, see Glossary of American football.							24	21

== Season news ==
During Spring Training QB Jake Heaps was named one of the top 3 non-AQ players to watch in 2011 by ESPN's Andrea Adelson.

Rivals.com named OT Matt Reynolds as No. 24 on their top 100 countdown in 2011. Reynolds would later be named on ESPN's Pre-Season All-American team.

At the Utah State game, Brandon Doman proposed benching Heaps and seeing what Riley Nelson could do. Nelson rallied the Cougars to beat the Aggies and would become the starting QB for every game he was healthy in the rest of the season. Nelson would go on to win 4 FBS Independent Player of the Week awards.

BYU decided to add running back Michael Alisa to their running back rotation at homecoming. Alisa would become the starting RB for the rest of the season after going for 91 yards on 16 carries.

Matt Putnam was ruled eligible for the Cougars starting in October and became one of the many linebacker beasts.

On November 7, Bronco Mendenhall announced that senior Jordan Pendleton would have season ending knee surgery. As a tribute for his teammates play and attitude, Kyle Van Noy would wear his number at senior night. Pendleton won two FBS Independent defensive player of the week awards during his senior season.

On December 5, Jake Heaps announced he would transfer after the semester ended. James Lark would resume the backup QB role for the bowl game and for the 2012 season. It was later announced he would transfer to Kansas.
