= George Peacock (luthier) =

American luthier (1942–2011)

George Philip Peacock (February 3, 1942 – December 27, 2011) was an American luthier best known for building flamenco guitars and as the owner of Peacock Music, which served the stringed instrument community of San Francisco for four decades and was, until its closure after his death, the oldest instrument shop in the city. Peacock was a member of the Guild of American Luthiers and St. Philip's Choir, and was the last luthier in San Francisco upon his death in 2011.

== Early years ==
Peacock was born in Crescent City, California, the son of a logger. He later moved to the Bay Area, first attending San Jose State University where he studied chemistry and geology (1961), and later transferring to San Francisco State University and graduating with a degree in the humanities (BA, 1965). After graduation, Peacock began working as a skilled woodworker, joining the union and becoming an apprentice carpenter, but soon tired of the work. He realized he had the skills for working with instruments when someone asked him to fix a guitar. Peacock took his first apprenticeship under Warren White, widely considered to have been one of the best American luthiers of the late 20th century. He later moved to Spain to study flamenco guitars in greater depth.

== Peacock Music ==
After returning from Europe, Peacock eventually started his own business, first running a shop out of his apartment on the porch. He opened his own commercial store, Peacock Music, in the early 1970s on the site of the old Chinatown Meat Co. in Duboce Triangle at 15th and Noe. Peacock made use of the old meat company equipment left behind for the entirety of his career, hanging stringed instruments on meat hooks and cutting wood on the old meat bandsaw. Peacock Music serviced the most famous names in music, including Fleetwood Mac, The Who, Foghat, Taj Mahal, Van Morrison, Chris Isaak, and Metallica. In 1980, Peacock Music was featured by luthier Doug Roomian in an article about instrument making published by The Next Whole Earth Catalog. Peacock was said to specialize in "classical, flamenco and steel-stringed guitars". Frets magazine featured Peacock's signature rosette design work for guitars in 1987, calling it "simple, but striking".

== Later years ==
The store received increasing attention in the 1990s when UK's Channel 4 aired an extreme sports episode of High Five which focused on the street skateboarding scene. Noah Peacock, George's son, a skater and employee of Peacock Music, was interviewed, and gave the host a tour of the shop and introduced his father. Noah later represented the store at the 1995 Guild of American Luthiers Convention, where he was photographed receiving an autograph from Spanish luthier José Romanillos during a bracing workshop. The family store received additional attention in 2011 when George was diagnosed with brain cancer. In October of that year, String Thing!, a concert benefit, was held to raise money for the family.
