= Del Norte Unified School District =

Public schools in California, United States

Address
- 301 West Washington Boulevard Crescent City, California, 95531; United States
- Coordinates: 41.772139°N 124.206420°W

District information
- Type: Public school district
- Motto: Equipping Students for Success
- Grades: K–12
- Superintendent: Jeff Harris
- Schools: 11
- NCES District ID: 0610770

Students and staff
- Enrollment: 3,564 (2020–2021)
- Teachers: 162.11 (on an FTE basis)
- Staff: 278.37 (on an FTE basis)
- Student–teacher ratio: 21.99:1

Other information
- Website: www.dnusd.org

Del Norte Unified School District is a public school district serving Del Norte County, California, United States. It has an enrollment of 3,679 students across eleven schools: eight elementary schools, a middle school, and two high schools. The superintendent is Jeff Harris. Del Norte High School and Crescent Elk Middle School, within the district, are among the few schools that provide instruction in the Yurok language.

Its attendance boundary is the same as the borders of the county.

== Demographics ==
As of 2016-17, the district had a total enrollment of 3,679 students with 160.47 classroom teachers (on an FTE basis), for a student–teacher ratio of 22.93. Of those 3,679 students, 65.7 percent of them qualified for free or reduced lunch under the National School Lunch Act. 7.6 percent of students were enrolled in English as a second or foreign language classes. The district is primarily White (63 percent), with small Native American (7 percent), Asian (3 percent), Black (2 percent) and Multiracial (6 percent) minorities. 19 percent of students are Hispanic or Latino. As of 2018, the district has a very high chronic absentee rate, 20.9 percent.

== Schools ==
=== High schools ===
- Del Norte High School
- Sunset High School

=== Middle schools ===
- Crescent Elk Middle School

=== Elementary schools ===
- Bess Maxwell Elementary School
- Joe Hamilton Elementary School
- Margaret Keating Elementary School
- Mary Peacock Elementary School
- Mountain Elementary School
- PIne Grove Elementary School
- Redwood Elementary School
- Smith River Elementary School
