= Crescent City North, California =

Crescent City North
- Former census-designated place District of Crescent City
- Location in Del Norte County and the state of California
- Coordinates: 41°45′58″N 124°13′01″W
- Country: United States
- State: California
- County: Del Norte
- City: Crescent City

Area
  - Total: 1.9 sq mi (5 km^{2})
  - Land: 1.9 sq mi (5 km^{2})
  - Water: 0 sq mi (0 km^{2})

Population (2000)
  - Total: 4,028
  - Density: 2,086/sq mi (805.6/km^{2})
- Time zone: UTC-8 (Pacific (PST))
  - Summer (DST): UTC-7 (PDT)
- ZIP code: 95531
- Area code(s): 707, 369
- FIPS code: 06-17030

Crescent City North is a former census-designated place (CDP) in Del Norte County, California, United States. The population was 4,028 at the 2000 census. The elevation is 33 feet (10 m).

Crescent City North ceased to be a CDP prior to the 2010 census because most of its area was annexed by neighboring Crescent City.

== Geography ==
Crescent City North is located at 41°45′58″N 124°13′01″W.

According to the United States Census Bureau, the CDP has a total area of 2.0 square miles (5.2 km^{2}), all of it land.

== Demographics ==
Historical population
| Census | Pop. | Note | %± |
|---|---|---|---|
| 1960 | 3,086 | | — |
| 1970 | 3,053 | | −1.1% |
| 1980 | 2,846 | | −6.8% |
| 1990 | 3,853 | | 35.4% |
| 2000 | 4,028 | | 4.5% |
U.S. Decennial Census; 1960 1970 1980; 1990 2000

Crescent City North first appeared as an unincorporated community in the 1960 U.S. census under the name Crescent Northwest. The name was changed to Crescent North in the 1970 U.S. census. In the 1980 U.S. census, it was redesignated as a census designated place. It was deleted prior to the 2010 U.S. census after being partially annexed to Crescent City.

As of the census of 2000, there were 4,028 people, 1,567 households, and 1,021 families residing in the CDP. The population density was 2,069.1 inhabitants per square mile (798.9/km^{2}). There were 1,761 housing units at an average density of 904.6 per square mile (349.3/km^{2}). The racial makeup of the CDP was 78.53% White, 0.82% Black or African American, 6.80% Native American, 4.79% Asian, 0.10% Pacific Islander, 4.20% from other races, and 4.77% from two or more races. 9.01% of the population were Hispanic or Latino of any race.

There were 1,567 households, out of which 34.7% had children under the age of 18 living with them, 42.4% were married couples living together, 17.5% had a female householder with no husband present, and 34.8% were non-families. 27.9% of all households were made up of individuals, and 9.7% had someone living alone who was 65 years of age or older. The average household size was 2.56 and the average family size was 3.12.

In the CDP, the population was spread out, with 31.0% under the age of 18, 7.1% from 18 to 24, 28.1% from 25 to 44, 21.3% from 45 to 64, and 12.5% who were 65 years of age or older. The median age was 35 years. For every 100 females, there were 92.6 males. For every 100 females age 18 and over, there were 87.5 males.

The median income for a household in the CDP was $29,478, and the median income for a family was $30,969. Males had a median income of $36,728 versus $22,875 for females. The per capita income for the CDP was $14,649. About 14.3% of families and 17.1% of the population were below the poverty line, including 22.1% of those under age 18 and 4.7% of those age 65 or over.

== Politics ==
In the state legislature Crescent City North is in the 2nd senatorial district, represented by Democrat Mike McGuire, and the 2nd Assembly district, represented by Democrat Chris Rogers.

Federally, Crescent City North is in California's 2nd congressional district, represented by Democrat Jared Huffman.
