= Point St. George =

Coastal landmark in Del Norte County, California

Coordinates: 41°46′59″N 124°15′21″W

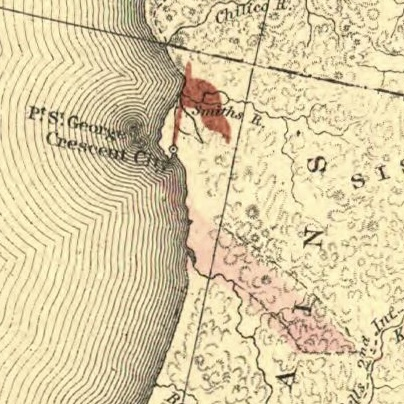
Pt. St. George and Crescent City on a U.S. military map of 1858, likely marking the site of Fort Ter-Waw or Fort Dick

Point St. George is a location in Del Norte County, California along the Pacific Ocean. St. George Reef Light is located offshore as is Point St. George Reef Offshore State Marine Conservation Area. Point St. George is a "prominent rocky point" located about 3 mi (4.8 km) north of Crescent City, California. Point St. George was the site of the Brother Jonathan disaster in 1865.
