= Battery Point Light =

Lighthouse in California, United States

Battery Point Light Crescent City
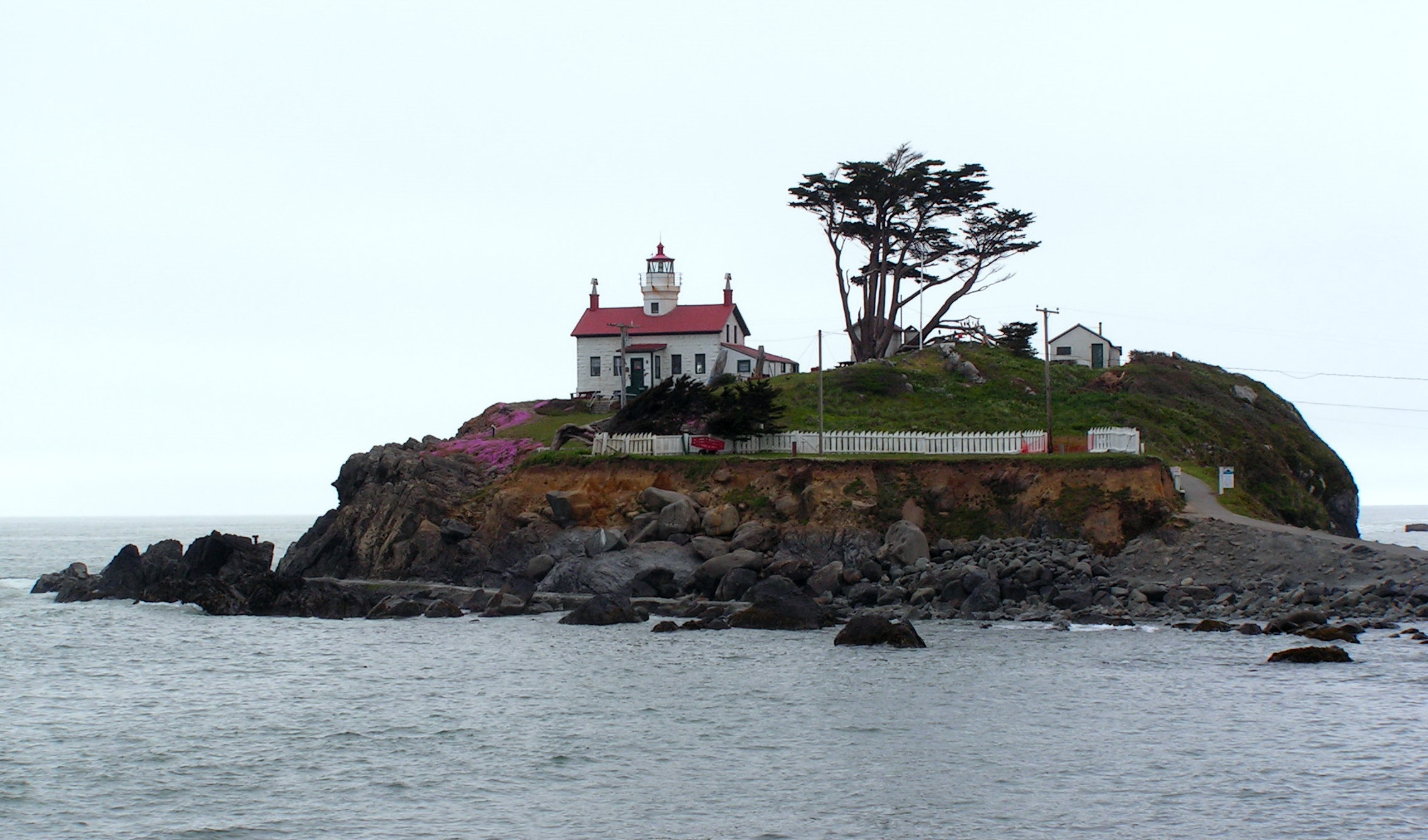
- Battery Point Light
- Location: Crescent City; California; United States
- Coordinates: 41.7441°N 124.2031°W

Tower
- Constructed: 1856
- Foundation: natural emplaced
- Construction: brick tower and granite keeper's house
- Automated: 1953
- Height: 45 feet (14 m)
- Shape: cylindrical tower with balcony and lantern on the roof of keeper's house
- Markings: white tower, red lantern
- Operator: Del Norte County Historical Society
- Heritage: National Register of Historic Places listed place, California Historical Landmark

Light
- First lit: 1856
- Deactivated: 1965–1982 continuously occupied
- Focal height: 77 feet (23 m)
- Lens: Fourth order Fresnel lens (original), 375 mm lens (current)
- Range: 12 nautical miles; 23 kilometres (14 mi)
- Characteristic: Fl W 30s.

U.S. National Register of Historic Places
- Official name: Crescent City Lighthouse
- Reference no.: 83001177

California Historical Landmark
- Reference no.: 951

Battery Point Light is a lighthouse in Crescent City, California, United States. It is registered as a California Historical Landmark, and is listed on the National Register of Historic Places as "Crescent City Lighthouse".

== History ==
Battery Point Light was one of the first lighthouses on the California coast. Rugged mountains and unbridged rivers meant coastal travel was essential for the economic survival of this region. In 1855, Congress appropriated $15,000 for the construction of a lighthouse on the tiny islet, which is connected to Battery Point by an isthmus which is visible and can be traversed on foot at low tide. Although not included in the 1852 contract by the United States Lighthouse Service for the first eight west coast lighthouses, the Battery Point Lighthouse was actually lit ten days before the Humboldt Harbor Lighthouse, the last of the original eight to become operational. The fourth-order Fresnel lens was lit in 1856. The lighthouse was automated in 1953, and a modern 14.8-inch (375 mm) lens replaced the fourth-order Fresnel lens. Theophilis Magruder was the station's first keeper; Wayne Piland was its last before automation in 1953. The 1964 Alaska earthquake, the strongest earthquake ever recorded in the northern hemisphere, caused a tsunami. The lighthouse survived. In the following year, the modern beacon that replaced the Fresnel lens in the tower was switched off, and a flashing light at the end of the nearby breakwater served as the harbor's navigational aid. In 1982, the light in the lighthouse tower was lit again, and the Battery Point Lighthouse was listed as a private aid to navigation.

== Battery Point Lighthouse and Museum ==
Del Norte Historical Society operates the Battery Point Lighthouse and Museum. The lighthouse is open to the public only when low tide permits access, daily from April through September with tours between 10 AM and 4 PM. October through March, the lighthouse is open for tours on weekends, from 10 AM to 4 PM. In both seasons, visits to the Battery Point Lighthouse and Island are only possible at low tides. It is recommended that visitors research tide times before visiting, as the tide rises quickly at the point and the land bridge to the lighthouse can disappear rapidly. The museum includes the lighthouse keeper's quarters with period furniture and artifacts since the 1850s, as well as displays of maritime artifacts, photos and historical documents. Tours include a climb into the light tower.

== In popular culture ==
At least two novels have been set at Battery Point Light. Walk Across the Sea, by Susan Fletcher, is a 2001 work of historical fiction for teens. The Lightkeeper's Daughter, by Colleen Coble, is a 2010 inspirational romance for adults.

Also, the music video for the Tim McGraw song "Not a Moment Too Soon" has scenes of McGraw next to the light on the lighthouse's top balcony and scenes of the Battery Point Light from a distance.

== Gallery ==
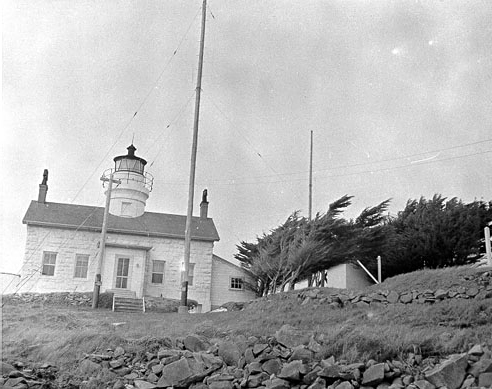
U.S. Coast Guard Archive

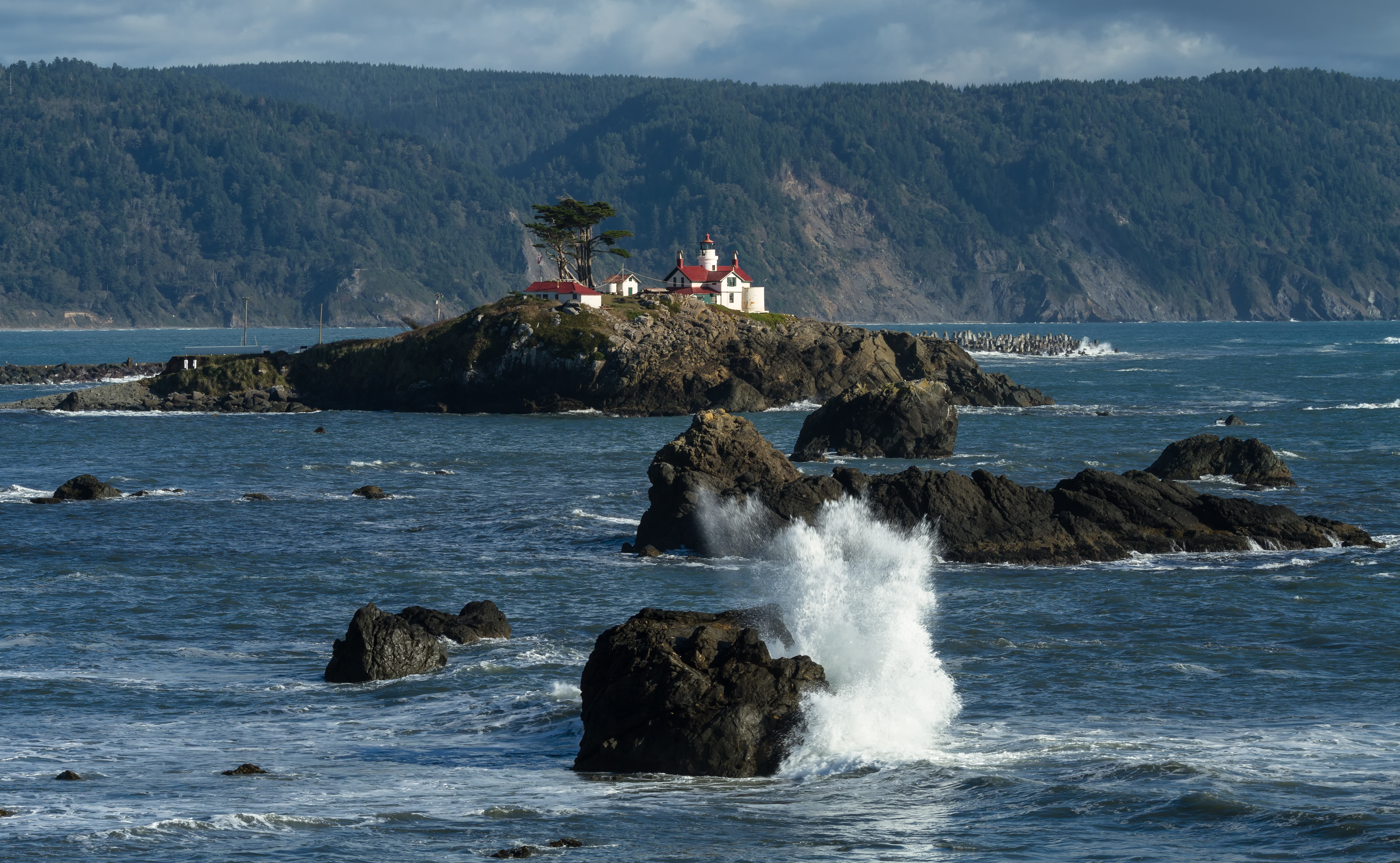
Battery Point Lighthouse from shore

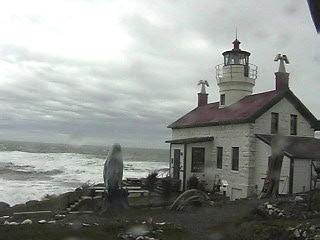
Battery Point Lighthouse towards shore

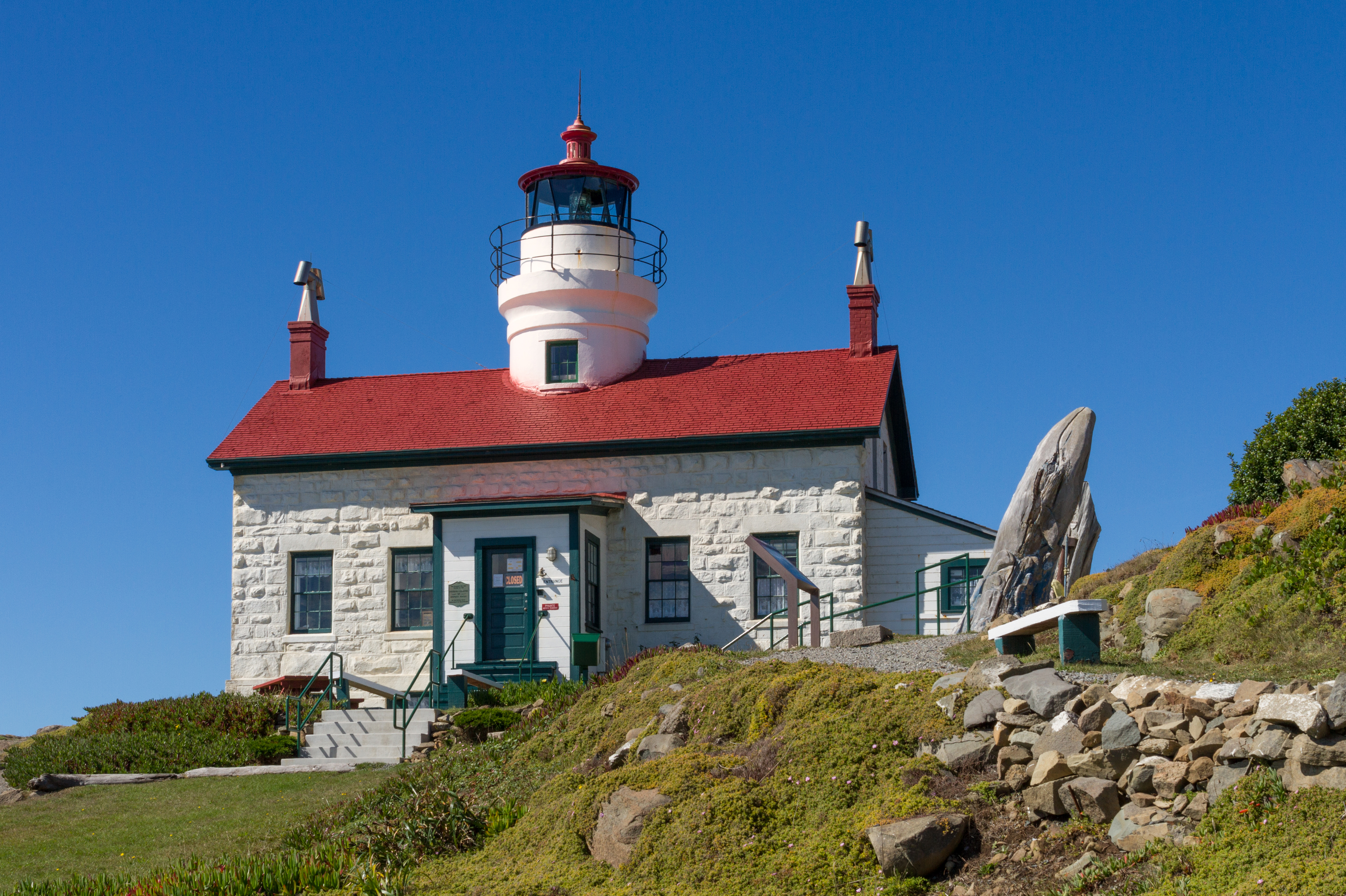
Front door entrance and surrounding yard

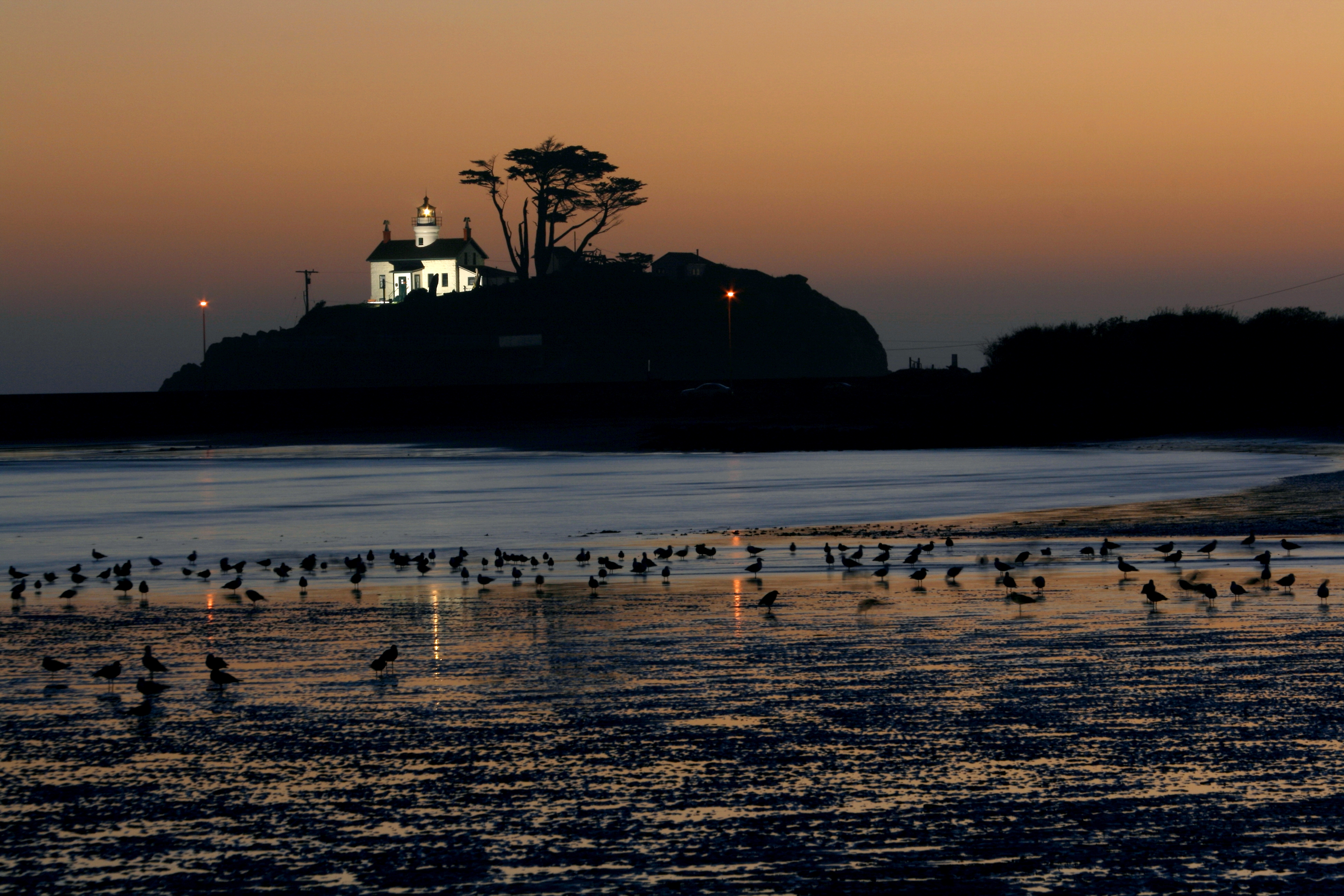
Battery Point Lighthouse at sunset

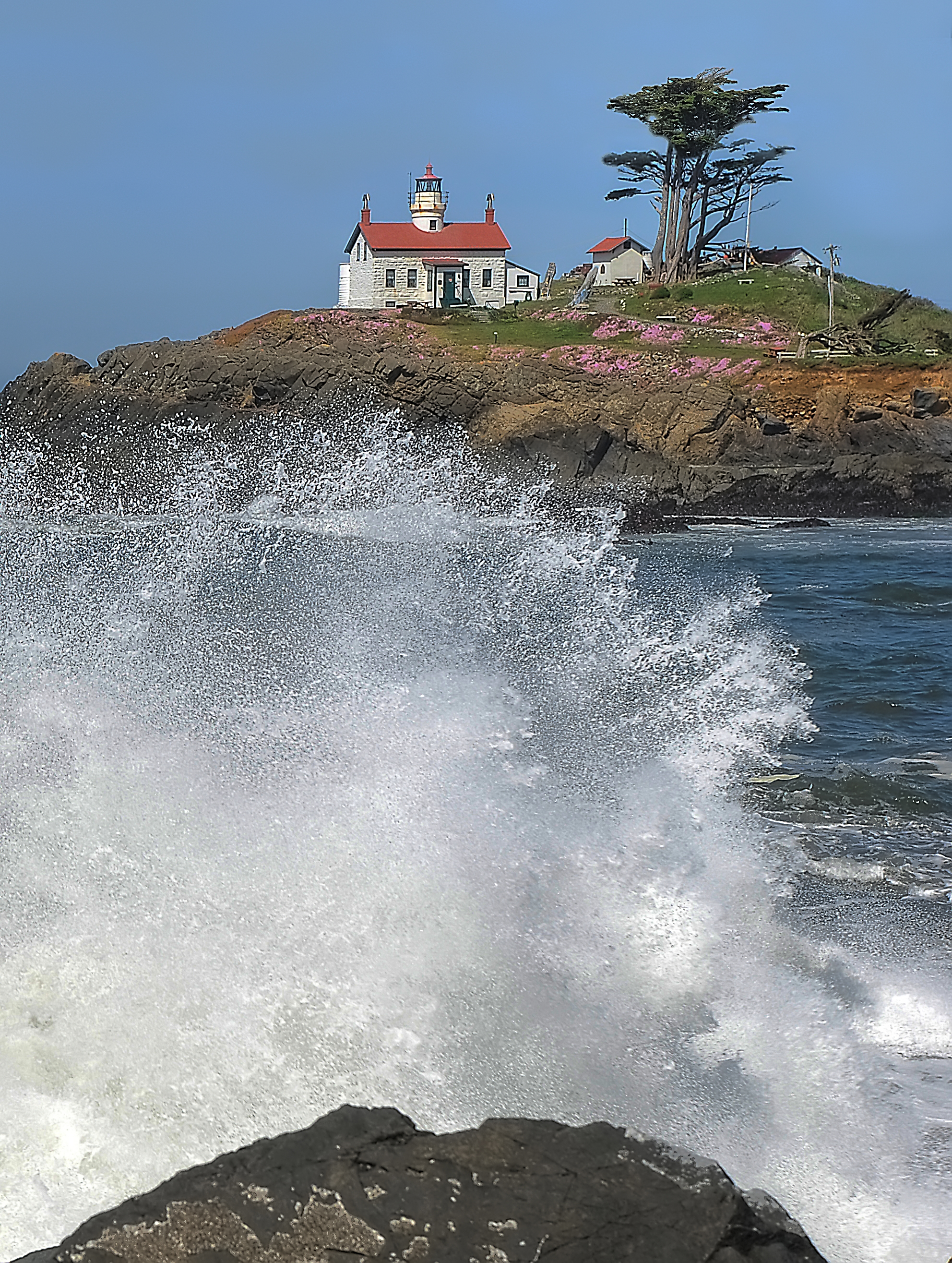
Battery Point Light on the coast of California

== See also ==
- List of lighthouses in the United States
- List of Museums in the North Coast (California)
