= Crescent City, California =

City in California, United States

- City
- City of Crescent City
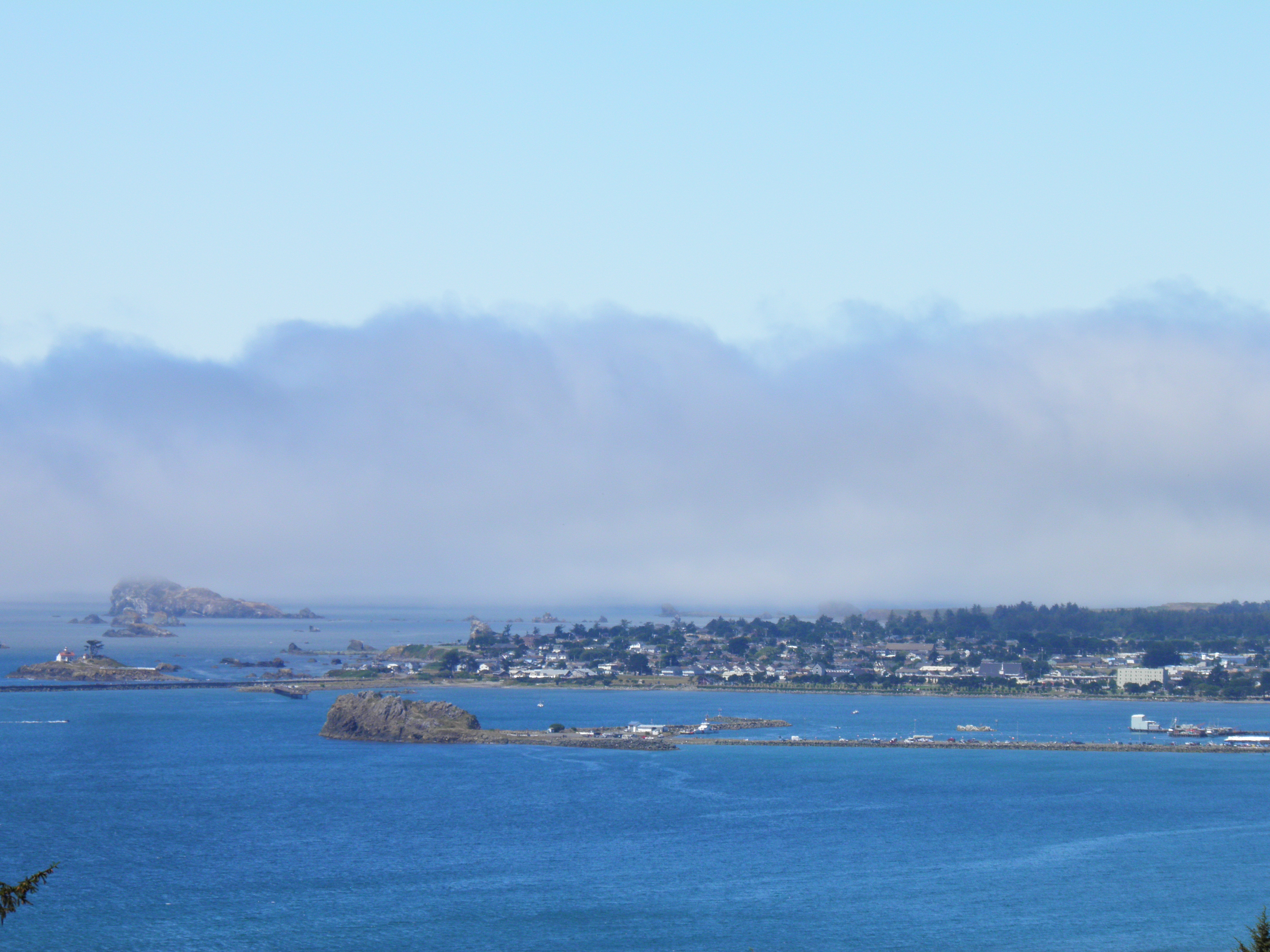
- Looking towards Crescent City

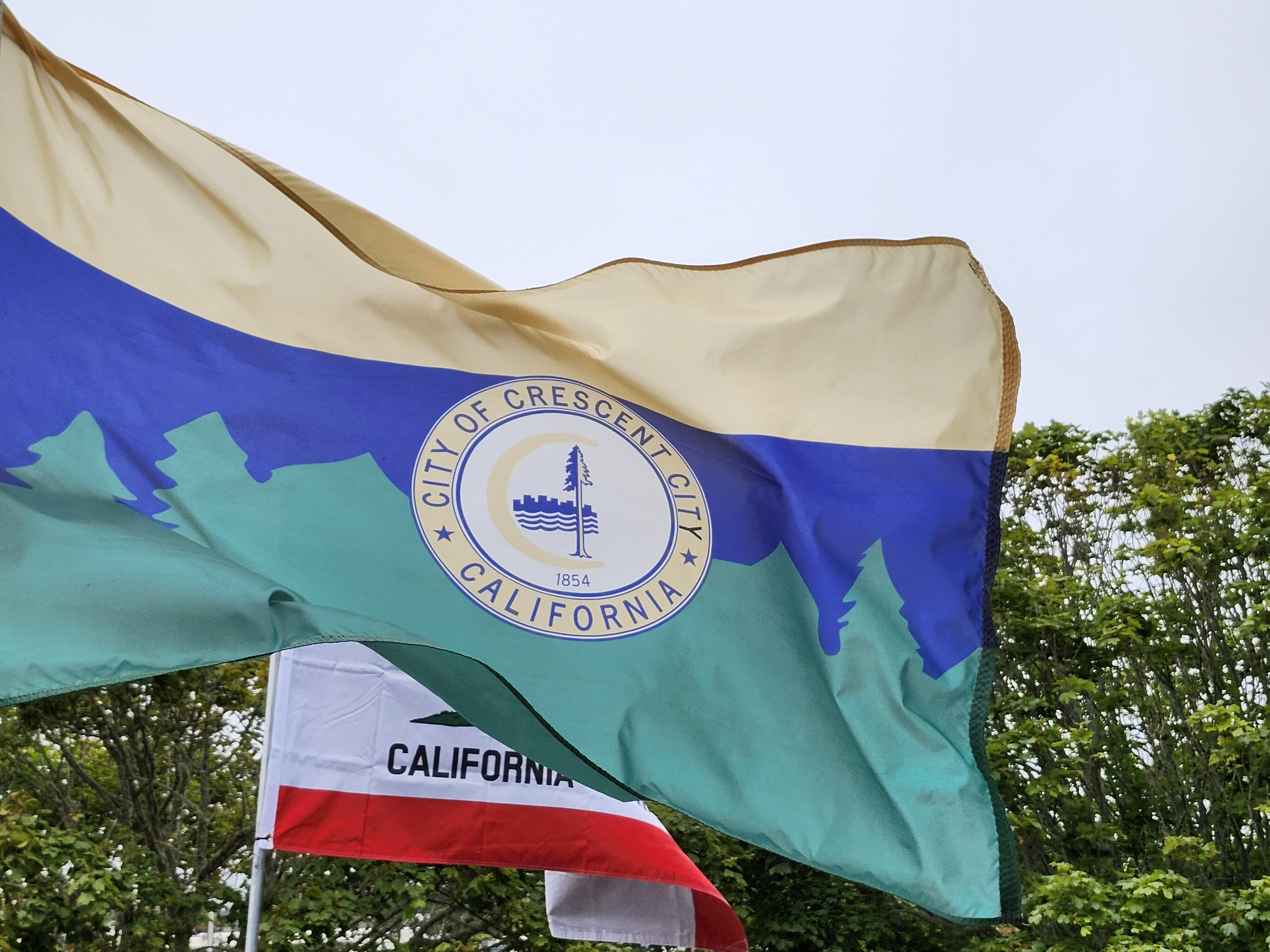
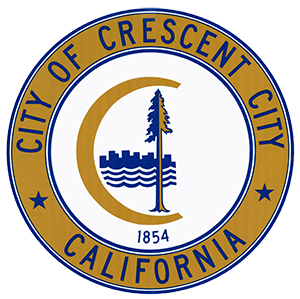
- Flag Seal
- Interactive map of Crescent City
- Location in California Location in the United States
- Coordinates: 41°45′22″N 124°12′06″W
- Country: United States
- State: California
- County: Del Norte
- Incorporated: April 13, 1854

Government
  - Type: Mayor/Council
  - Mayor: Isaiah Wright
  - State senator: Mike McGuire (D)
  - Assemblymember: Chris Rogers (D)
  - U. S. rep.: Jared Huffman (D)

Area
  - Total: 2.41 sq mi (6.25 km^{2})
  - Land: 1.97 sq mi (5.09 km^{2})
  - Water: 0.45 sq mi (1.17 km^{2}) 18.7%
- Elevation: 43 ft (13 m)

Population (2020)
  - Total: 6,673
  - Density: 3,398.7/sq mi (1,312.26/km^{2})
- Time zone: UTC-08:00 (PST)
  - Summer (DST): UTC-07:00 (PDT)
- ZIP codes: 95531, 95532, 95538
- Area code: 707, 369
- FIPS code: 06-17022
- GNIS feature IDs: 277494, 2410262
- Website: crescentcity.org

Crescent City (Tolowa: Taa-’at-dvn; Yurok: Kohpey; Wiyot: Daluwagh) is the only incorporated city in Del Norte County, California, United States, of which it is also the county seat. The city is on the North Coast of California and had a total population of 6,673 in the 2020 census, down from 7,643 in the 2010 census.

The city is the site of the Redwood National Park headquarters, as well as the historic Battery Point Light. Due to the richness of the local Pacific Ocean waters and the related catch, and ease of access, Crescent City Harbor serves as home port for numerous commercial fishing vessels. The population includes inmates at Pelican Bay State Prison, also within the city limits, and the former census-designated place Crescent City North annexed to the city.

Crescent City's offshore geography makes it unusually susceptible to tsunamis. In 1964, much of the city was destroyed by four tsunami waves generated by the Great Alaskan earthquake off Anchorage, Alaska. In March 2011, the city's harbor suffered extensive damage and destruction from tsunamis generated by the earthquake off Miyagi Prefecture, Japan. Several dozen vessels and many of the docks they were moored to were destroyed as wave cycles related to the tsunamis exceeded 8 ft (2.4 m).

== History ==
Crescent City was founded on the site of Tolowa Indian Settlements at Battery Point, Pebble Beach, south of Point St. George, and north of Point St. George. In Tolowa: Taa-’at-dvn. In the Yurok it is Kohpey, and in Wiyot: Daluwagh).

In 1855, the U.S. Congress authorized the building of a lighthouse at "the battery point" (a high tide island on the coast of Crescent City) which is still functioning as a historical landmark.

Europeans began moving to the area in the 1850s. Crescent City was incorporated as a city in 1854.

The population includes inmates at Pelican Bay State Prison, also within the city limits although discontiguous and some ten miles away, and most of the former census-designated place Crescent City North annexed to the city prior to the 2010 U.S. census.

The city is also the site of the Redwood National Park headquarters, as well as the historic Battery Point Light.

Due to the richness of the local Pacific Ocean waters and the related catch, and ease of access, Crescent City Harbor serves as home port for numerous commercial fishing vessels.

=== Namesake ships ===
Crescent City was a 113 t (111 long tons; 125 short tons) schooner built in 1848 by Joshua T. Foster of Medford, Massachusetts.

A 1906 ship named Crescent City was the former Jim Butler, a 701 t (690 long tons; 773 short tons) steam schooner built by Lindstrom Shipbuilding Company in Aberdeen, Washington, that wrecked in the Channel Islands, off Santa Cruz Island, in 1927.

=== Shipwrecks ===
Two notable shipwrecks happened off the coast, in 1865 and then at the start of World War II in December 1941, when a Japanese submarine hit a US oil tanker.

The Brother Jonathan, a paddle steamer, crashed on an uncharted rock near Point St. George, off the coast of Crescent City, California, on July 30, 1865.

The SS Emidio, a 6,912 t (6,803 long tons; 7,619 short tons) tanker of the General Petroleum Corporation (later Mobil Oil), was the first casualty of the Imperial Japanese Navy's submarine force action on California's Pacific Coast on December 20, 1941. The damaged tanker broke up on the rocks off Crescent City. The remaining pieces of the ship are now California Historical Landmark #497.

== Geography ==
According to the United States Census Bureau, the city has a total area of 2.415 sq mi (6.25 km^{2}), of which 1.963 sq mi (5.08 km^{2}) (81.3%) is land and 0.452 sq mi (1.17 km^{2}) (18.7%) is water. Fishing and crabbing, tourism, and timber are the major sources of income in Del Norte County. Elk Creek flows into the Pacific Ocean at Crescent City. Its nearest Californian place of any size to its interior is Happy Camp separated by roughly 42 mi (68 km) by air, but, due to the unsuitable terrain, it is much farther by road. The nearest city is fellow coastal city Brookings, Oregon, around 20 mi (32 km) to its north. The Humboldt Bay area encompassing Eureka and Arcata is more than 60 mi (97 km) to its south. Crescent City is as far north in latitude as Chicago, Middle Island in Ontario, Canada, as well as New England on the Atlantic side. It is as much as nine degrees latitude north of San Diego at the southern tip of the state. Crescent City is closer to Vancouver, Canada (838 km (521 mi)) than to Los Angeles (1,003 km (623 mi)).

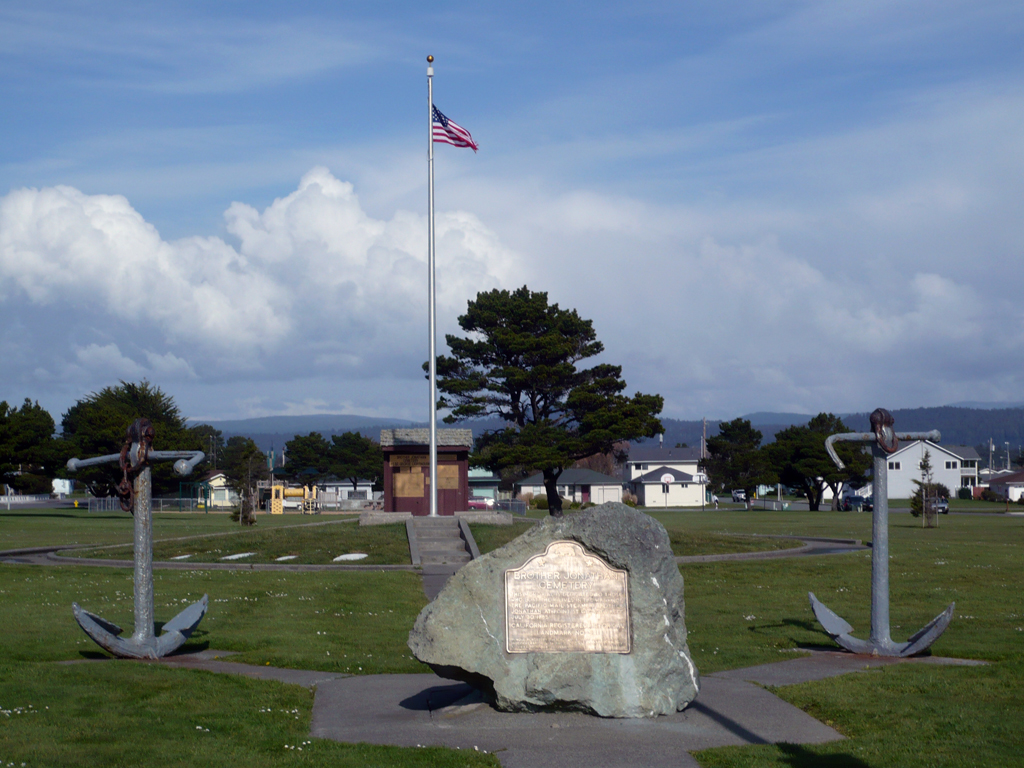
Brother Jonathan Cemetery in Crescent City

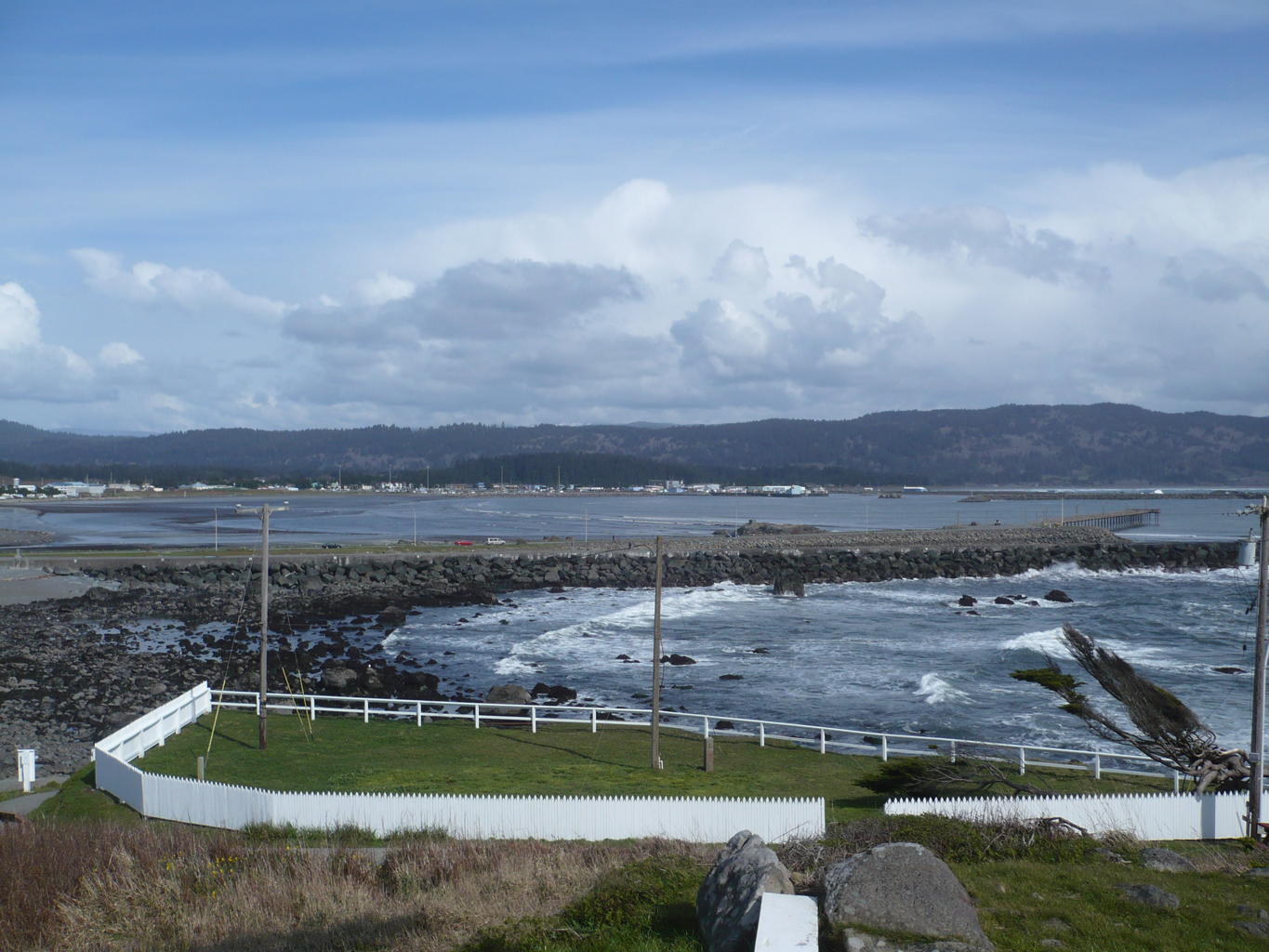
Crescent City Harbor from Battery Point Lighthouse

=== Climate ===
Crescent City has a warm-summer Mediterranean climate (Köppen Csb) while under the Trewartha system, it is labeled an oceanic climate (Dobk). The wettest months are from October to March; the wettest month is December with 11.14 in or 283.0 mm and the driest month is July with 0.33 in or 8.4 mm. The average high and low temperatures in December are 55 °F or 12.8 °C and 41 °F or 5 °C. The average high and low temperatures in August are 64 °F or 17.8 °C and 53 °F or 12 °C. On average, four mornings each winter fall below 32 °F or 0 °C.

The highest temperature recorded in Crescent City was 97 °F (36 °C) on September 20, 1989, and September 21, 1939. The lowest temperature on record was 19 °F (−7 °C) on January 20, 1937, and December 21, 1990. The maximum monthly precipitation was 31.25 in (793.8 mm) in November 1973. The wettest "rain year" was from July 1937 to June 1938 when 107.74 in (2,736.6 mm) fell and the driest from July 2013 to June 2014 with 33.58 in (852.9 mm). The maximum 24-hour precipitation was 7.73 in (196.3 mm) on January 9, 1995. The highest snowfall recorded for any period in 24 hours was 6.0 in (0.15 m) on January 26, 1972. The 30-year average annual precipitation in Crescent City has decreased from 64 inches (1,630 mm) in the 1980–2010 period to about 58 inches (1,470 mm) over the 1990–2020 period.

The warmest ever overnight low was 68 °F (20 °C) in 1929 and the mean between 1991 and 2020 was at the modest 59 °F (15 °C). Cold winter days are also rare. The coldest daytime temperature was 30 °F (−1.1 °C) in 1924, which remains the last time Crescent City did not climb above the freezing point for 24 hours. Between 1991 and 2020, the coldest maximum temperature averaged 44 °F (6.7 °C).

Climate data for Crescent City, California (Del Norte County Airport), 1991–2020 normals, extremes 1894–present
Month	Jan	Feb	Mar	Apr	May	Jun	Jul	Aug	Sep	Oct	Nov	Dec	Year
Record high °F (°C)	75 (24)	78 (26)	88 (31)	86 (30)	89 (32)	91 (33)	96 (36)	95 (35)	97 (36)	93 (34)	80 (27)	80 (27)	97 (36)
Mean maximum °F (°C)	65.5 (18.6)	66.2 (19.0)	64.3 (17.9)	65.6 (18.7)	67.8 (19.9)	69.1 (20.6)	69.2 (20.7)	70.7 (21.5)	74.9 (23.8)	76.6 (24.8)	67.6 (19.8)	63.7 (17.6)	80.8 (27.1)
Mean daily maximum °F (°C)	56.2 (13.4)	56.2 (13.4)	55.8 (13.2)	57.2 (14.0)	59.3 (15.2)	61.6 (16.4)	63.0 (17.2)	64.2 (17.9)	64.5 (18.1)	62.3 (16.8)	58.2 (14.6)	55.2 (12.9)	59.5 (15.3)
Daily mean °F (°C)	49.0 (9.4)	49.3 (9.6)	49.3 (9.6)	50.8 (10.4)	53.3 (11.8)	55.5 (13.1)	57.3 (14.1)	58.5 (14.7)	57.3 (14.1)	54.8 (12.7)	51.1 (10.6)	48.3 (9.1)	52.9 (11.6)
Mean daily minimum °F (°C)	41.9 (5.5)	42.4 (5.8)	42.8 (6.0)	44.4 (6.9)	47.2 (8.4)	49.3 (9.6)	51.6 (10.9)	52.8 (11.6)	50.2 (10.1)	47.2 (8.4)	44.0 (6.7)	41.4 (5.2)	46.3 (7.9)
Mean minimum °F (°C)	33.1 (0.6)	33.0 (0.6)	34.2 (1.2)	36.1 (2.3)	39.2 (4.0)	42.1 (5.6)	45.3 (7.4)	46.4 (8.0)	43.5 (6.4)	39.0 (3.9)	34.7 (1.5)	32.7 (0.4)	29.9 (−1.2)
Record low °F (°C)	19 (−7)	23 (−5)	27 (−3)	29 (−2)	30 (−1)	32 (0)	36 (2)	34 (1)	33 (1)	32 (0)	23 (−5)	19 (−7)	19 (−7)
Average precipitation inches (mm)	9.40 (239)	6.94 (176)	7.81 (198)	5.12 (130)	2.48 (63)	1.40 (36)	0.33 (8.4)	0.37 (9.4)	1.10 (28)	4.07 (103)	7.82 (199)	11.14 (283)	57.98 (1,473)
Average precipitation days (≥ 0.01 in)	17.1	14.1	17.6	14.2	8.9	6.6	3.6	6.0	8.0	11.7	15.4	18.0	141.2
Source: NOAA

=== Tsunamis ===
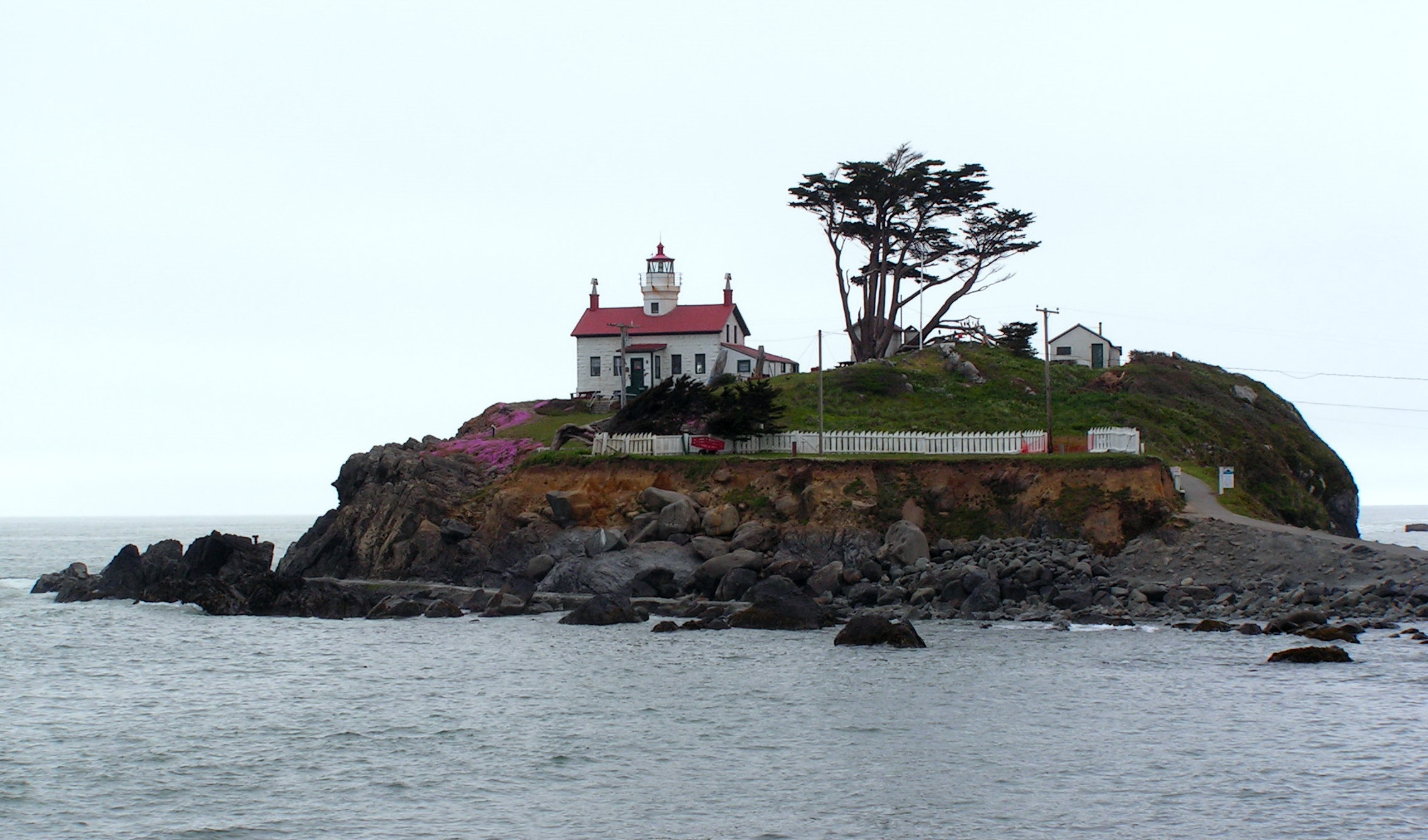
Battery Point Light, from jetty

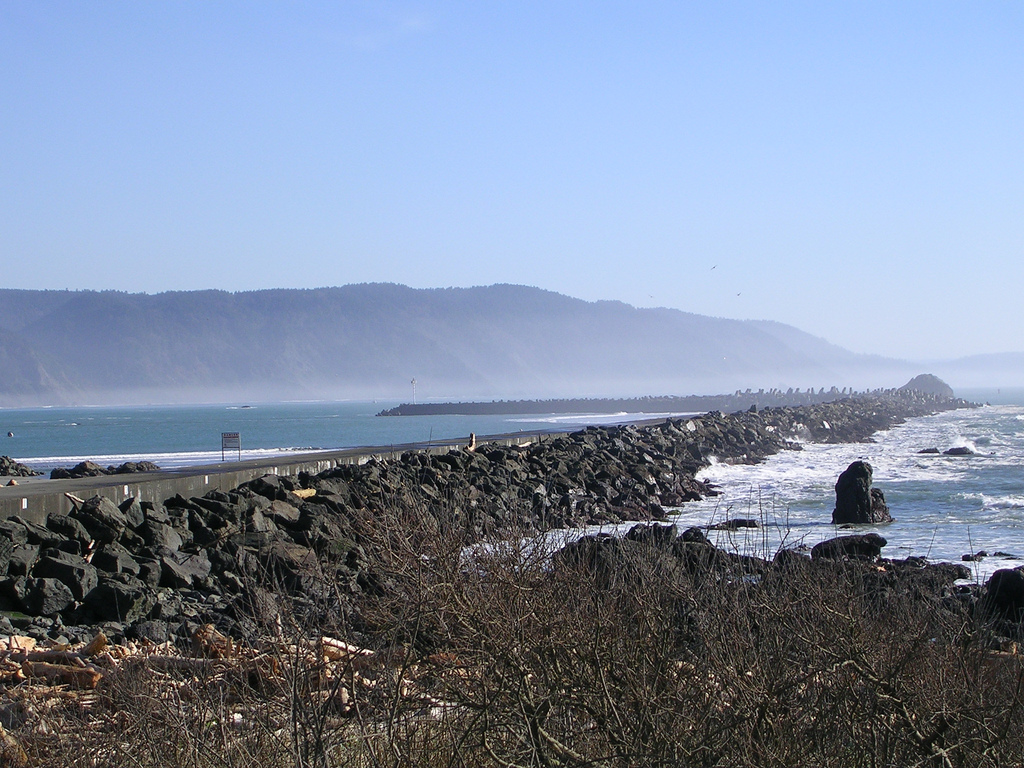
Crescent City's jetty

The bathymetry of the sea floor surrounding Crescent City has the effect of focusing tsunamis. According to researchers at Humboldt State University and the University of Southern California, the city experienced tsunami conditions 31 times between the years 1933 and 2008. Although many of these incidents were barely perceptible, eleven events included wave measurements exceeding one meter, four events caused damage, and one event in particular is commonly cited as "the largest and most destructive recorded tsunami to strike the United States Pacific Coast." The area is vulnerable to tsunamis generated by large earthquakes in remote parts of the Pacific Ocean, as well as locally by earthquakes along the Cascadia subduction zone and the Mendocino triple junction.

On March 27, 1964, the Great Alaskan earthquake in the Prince William Sound area, set in motion local landslide tsunamis, as well as a trans-Pacific wave. The tsunami wave travel time to Crescent City was 4.1 hours after the earthquake, but it only produced localized flooding. The second and third waves to hit Crescent City were smaller, but the fourth wave struck with a height of approximately 20 ft (6.1 m) after having drawn the harbor out nearly dry. The next morning the damage was counted: 289 buildings and businesses had been destroyed; 1,000 cars and 25 large fishing vessels had been crushed; 12 people were confirmed dead, over 100 were injured, and more were missing; and 60 blocks had been inundated, with 30 city blocks destroyed. Many victims had returned to the area before the fourth wave struck thinking that the event had passed. Although most of the missing were later accounted for, not all were tracked down. Insurance adjusters estimated that the city received more damage from the tsunami on a block-by-block basis than did Anchorage from the initial earthquake.

The tsunami raced down the West Coast with more deaths and destruction, but no other location was hit as hard. Crescent City bore the brunt, due to its offshore geography, position relative to the earthquake's strike-line, underwater contours such as the Cobb Seamount, and the position of rivers near the city. Although houses, buildings, and infrastructure were later rebuilt, years passed before the city recovered from the devastation to lives, property, and its economy. Since the 1980s, a jetty that serves as a breakwater has been protected from normal storm waves by hundreds of Dolos armor units, 38-ton concrete shapes.

Crescent City has not suffered fatalities or significant on-shore damage from a tsunami since 1964. Nevertheless, several Pacific tsunamis have caused significant damage to Crescent City harbor or have led to the evacuation of some parts of the city, and a tsunami-caused fatality occurred in the southern part of Del Norte County in 2011, at the mouth of the Klamath River, near Requa.

On June 14, 2005, the 2005 Eureka earthquake measuring 7.2 on the moment magnitude scale hit 90 mi (145 km) offshore. An estimated 6,000 people were evacuated when a tsunami warning was issued, and a 26 cm (10 in) tsunami wave hit the area. On November 15, 2006, the tsunami resulting from the magnitude 8.3 Kuril Islands earthquake reached the Pacific coast of the US and Canada and hit the harbor at Crescent City, causing damage to three docks and several boats. Governor Arnold Schwarzenegger declared a county state of emergency. More serious damage resulted from the tsunami spawned by the March 11, 2011 Tōhoku earthquake, a magnitude 9.0 earthquake that struck Japan. Parts of the city were evacuated, thirty-five boats were destroyed, and the harbor suffered major damage. The reported peak surge was over 8 ft (2.4 m) by 9:50am. There were no casualties in Crescent City, though one person was killed when swept out to sea near the mouth of the Klamath River, about 15 miles south of the city, and another five were swept out to sea in southern Oregon, but were quickly rescued. On July 29, 2025, the tsunami resulting from the magnitude 8.8 Kamchatka Peninsula earthquake again resulted in significant damage to the harbor.

== Demographics ==
Historical population
Census	Pop.	Note	%±
1860	638		—
1870	458		−28.2%
1880	343		−25.1%
1890	907		164.4%
1900	699		−22.9%
1910	1,114		59.4%
1920	955		−14.3%
1930	1,720		80.1%
1940	1,363		−20.8%
1950	1,706		25.2%
1960	2,958		73.4%
1970	2,586		−12.6%
1980	3,075		18.9%
1990	4,380		42.4%
2000	4,006		−8.5%
2010	7,643		90.8%
2020	6,673		−12.7%
2024 (est.)	6,209	▼	−7.0%
U.S. Decennial Census; 1860–1870 1880-1890; 1900 1910 1920; 1930 1940 1950; 1960 1970 1980; 1990 2000 2010; 2020

=== 2020 census ===
As of the 2020 census, Crescent City had a population of 6,673 and a population density of 3,399.4 inhabitants per square mile (1,312.5/km^{2}). The median age was 35.2 years. 15.0% of residents were under the age of 18, 8.2% were aged 18 to 24, 44.8% were aged 25 to 44, 21.9% were aged 45 to 64, and 10.1% were 65 years of age or older. For every 100 females, there were 224.1 males, and for every 100 females age 18 and over, there were 266.8 males age 18 and over.

The census reported that 57.3% of the population lived in households, 0.4% lived in non-institutionalized group quarters, and 42.3% were institutionalized. In addition, 60.0% of residents lived in urban areas, while 40.0% lived in rural areas.

There were 1,652 households, of which 33.3% had children under the age of 18 living in them. Of all households, 27.9% were married-couple households, 9.9% were cohabiting couple households, 25.4% had a male householder with no spouse or partner present, and 36.8% had a female householder with no spouse or partner present. About 36.7% of all households were made up of individuals, and 15.3% had someone living alone who was 65 years of age or older. The average household size was 2.32. There were 910 families (55.1% of all households).

There were 1,843 housing units at an average density of 938.9 units per square mile (362.5 units/km^{2}), of which 10.4% were vacant and 89.6% were occupied. Of occupied units, 30.5% were owner-occupied and 69.5% were occupied by renters. The homeowner vacancy rate was 4.2%, and the rental vacancy rate was 4.5%.

Racial composition as of the 2020 census
Race	Number	Percent
White	2,992	44.8%
Black or African American	725	10.9%
American Indian and Alaska Native	388	5.8%
Asian	288	4.3%
Native Hawaiian and Other Pacific Islander	5	0.1%
Some other race	1,758	26.3%
Two or more races	517	7.7%
Hispanic or Latino (of any race)	2,181	32.7%

=== Income and poverty ===
In 2023, the US Census Bureau estimated that the median household income was $41,131, and the per capita income was $18,254. About 13.8% of families and 19.9% of the population were below the poverty line.

=== 2010 census ===
The 2010 United States census reported that Crescent City had a population of 7,643. The population density was 3,164.9/sqmi (1,222.0/km^{2}). The racial makeup of Crescent City was 5,052 (66.1%) White, 910 (11.9%) African American, 370 (4.8%) Native American, 333 (4.4%) Asian, 7 (0.1%) Pacific Islander, 696 (9.1%) from other races, and 275 (3.6%) from two or more races. Hispanic or Latino of any race were 2,342 persons (30.6%).

The Census reported that 4,063 people (53.2% of the population) lived in households, 28 (0.4%) lived in non-institutionalized group quarters, and 3,552 (46.5%) were institutionalized. The very high institutionalized percentage is a result of the presence of Pelican Bay State Prison, which was annexed into the city limits in the 1990s.

There were 1,707 households, out of which 559 (32.7%) had children under the age of 18 living in them, 512 (30.0%) were opposite-sex married couples living together, 314 (18.4%) had a female householder with no husband present, 114 (6.7%) had a male householder with no wife present. There were 170 (10.0%) unmarried opposite-sex partnerships, and 7 (0.4%) same-sex married couples or partnerships. 614 households (36.0%) were made up of individuals, and 229 (13.4%) had someone living alone who was 65 years of age or older. The average household size was 2.38. There were 940 families (55.1% of all households); the average family size was 3.13.

The city population contained 1,107 people (14.5%) under the age of 18, 934 people (12.2%) aged 18 to 24, 3,292 people (43.1%) aged 25 to 44, 1,725 people (22.6%) aged 45 to 64, and 585 people (7.7%) who were 65 years of age or older. The median age was 34.9 years. For every 100 females, there were 250.1 males. For every 100 females age 18 and over, there were 298.5 males.

There were 1,906 housing units at an average density of 789.2/sqmi (304.7/km^{2}), of which 1,707 were occupied, of which 532 (31.2%) were owner-occupied, and 1,175 (68.8%) were occupied by renters. The homeowner vacancy rate was 7.7%; the rental vacancy rate was 4.8%. 1,203 people (15.7% of the population) lived in owner-occupied housing units and 2,860 people (37.4%) lived in rental housing units.

== Government ==
In the California State Legislature, Crescent City is in the 2nd senatorial district, represented by Democrat Mike McGuire, and the 2nd Assembly district, represented by Democrat Chris Rogers.

In the United States House of Representatives, Crescent City is in California's 2nd congressional district, represented by Democrat Jared Huffman.

== Education ==
The public schools of Crescent City are part of the Del Norte County Unified School District, which encompasses all of the public schools in Del Norte County. The following are schools within Crescent City or its immediate vicinity.

- Del Norte High School is the only public high school in Crescent City, located on the northern edge of town. It replaced the earlier high school that was more centrally located, and which remains today as a public-access gymnasium and county offices
- The Bess Maxwell Elementary School is the older of two elementary schools in the northern part of town that are located near the high school. Bess Maxwell serves grades 1–5. In its earlier years, it was a K–6 school
- The Castle Rock Charter School is a K–12 charter school that provides personalized education to students, and is the liaison school for parents who home school their children. It operates the Tah-Ah-Dun American Indian Magnet School to provide for the unique requirements of American Indian students who might be at risk. (Tah-Ah-Dun is the Tolowa name for Crescent City, honoring the Tolowa village that stood on present-day Crescent City.) The school is accredited by the Western Association of Schools and Colleges
- Crescent Elk Middle School is the oldest operating school site in town, centrally located in Crescent City. The site was originally a K–8 school, but slowly shed grade levels to other schools as it became a 4–6 school with a separate 7–8 program, then the 6–8 program that it is today
- Mary Peacock Elementary School is the newer of two elementary schools that are located near the high school. The creation of Pelican Bay State Prison caused an increase in housing demand in the Crescent City area, and an increased school district population. This school was built to address that demand, but is not directly associated with the prison
- Joe Hamilton Elementary School is a K–5 school located near Crescent Elk Middle School. It was founded as a K–3 school
- Pine Grove Elementary School has been a K–5 school for many years. It serves the eastern part of Crescent City
- Sunset High School is another Crescent City high school with its own child care center

== Transportation ==
Highways include U.S. Route 101 and U.S. Route 199.

SkyWest Airlines formerly served Del Norte County Airport (also known as Jack McNamara Field) as United Express until April 7, 2015. Most flights connected to San Francisco International Airport. PenAir contracted to begin serving the airport with Saab 340 turboprop aircraft beginning September 15, 2015.

Advanced Air currently operates flights from Crescent City (CEC) to Oakland International Airport (OAK) and Los Angeles-Hawthorne Airport (HHR).

Local public transit is provided by Redwood Coast Transit and by various taxi companies. Crescent City is also served by Curry Public Transit, and POINT.

The Crescent City Harbor serves as a commercial fishing port for salmon, shrimp, tuna, cod, and dungeness crab commercial fishing vessels. The harbor is also home to multiple fishing- and non-fishing-related businesses and harbor governmental offices. The Crescent City Harbor also has several pleasure boat docks.

== Arts and culture ==
=== Attractions ===
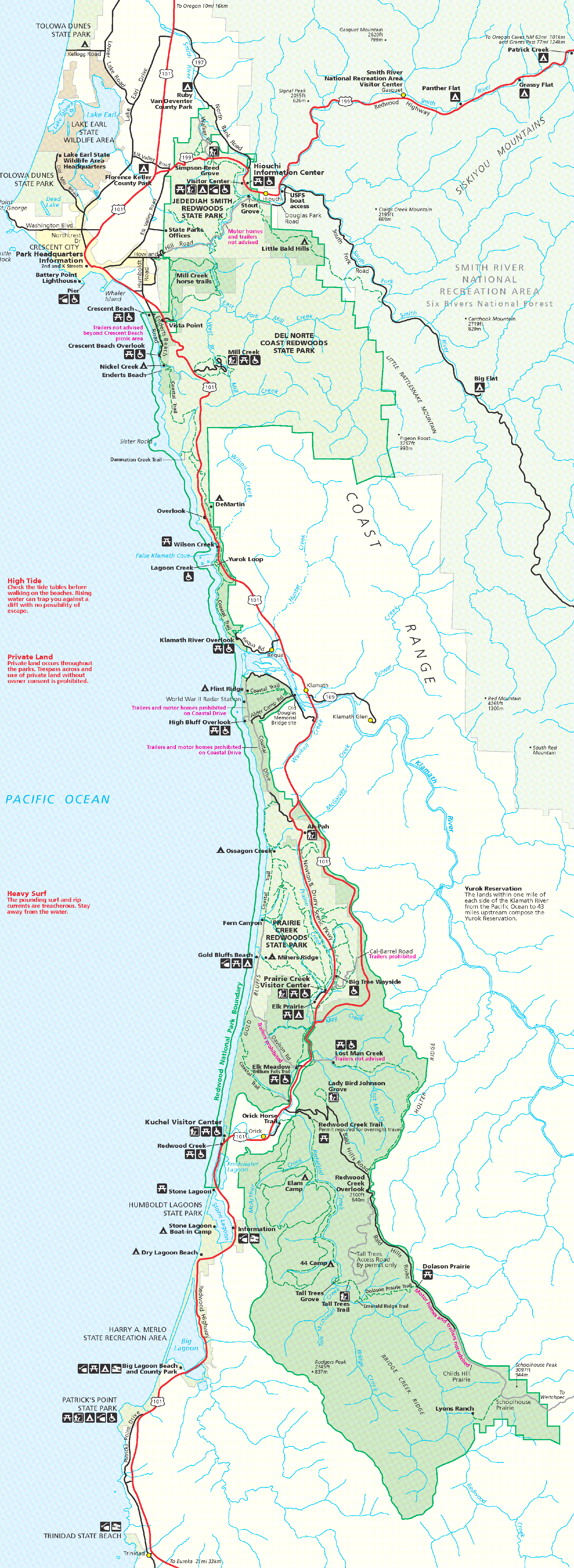
Map of the area surrounding Crescent City

- In town
  - Battery Point Lighthouse
  - Crescent City Harbor
  - Del Norte County Historical Society Main Museum
  - SS Emidio Memorial
- Nearby
  - Del Norte Coast Redwoods State Park
  - Jedediah Smith Redwoods State Park
  - Lost Monarch (tree)—Largest known Coastal Redwood by volume.
  - Pelican Bay State Prison
  - Redwood National and State Parks
  - St. George Reef Lighthouse
  - Smith River National Recreation Area
  - Tolowa Dunes State Park
  - Trees of Mystery

=== Annual events ===
- Forest Moon Festival – Star Wars-themed community festival – May
- Fourth of July fireworks display – July
- Sea Cruise Car Show Weekend – Columbus Day Weekend – October

== Notable people ==
- Eunice Bommelyn – tribal historian and the last person to speak Tolowa as a native first language
- Loren Bommelyn – tradition bearer for the Tolowa tribe
- Donald H. Clausen – American politician
- James F. Curtis – commander of Camp Lincoln
- Louis DeMartin – Del Norte County pioneer
- David Owen Dryden – builder-architect in the craftsman style
- Cody Hoffman – football wide receiver, and multi-record holder, for the football team of Brigham Young University
- Derrick Jensen (activist) – American ecophilosopher
- Rick Keene – California politician
- Lee Kohse – artist
- Clinton McKinnon – musician (Mr. Bungle)
- Justin Miller – lawyer and a federal appellate judge
- George Peacock, luthier
- Buck Pierce – professional football player, Canadian Football League
- Fred Rinne – visual and performance artist
- Max Steineke – petroleum geologist
- Audrey Wagner – outfielder in the All-American Girls Professional Baseball League
- Wendell Wood – conservationist and environmentalist

== International relations ==
=== Twin towns – sister cities ===
Crescent City is twinned with:

- Rikuzentakata, Japan (January 7, 2019)

== See also ==
- Achulet Massacre
- Fort Dick, California
- Lake Earl
- Yontoket Massacre
