= Del Norte High School (Crescent City, California) =

Location
- 1301 El Dorado Street; Crescent City, California; United States; 41.76984°N 124.20924°W

Information
- Type: Public
- Motto: "Go Warriors!"
- Established: 1898
- School district: Del Norte County Unified School District
- Principal: Alison Eckhart
- Teaching staff: 48.46 (FTE)
- Grades: 9 to 12
- Enrollment: 918 (2024-2025)
- Student to teacher ratio: 18.94
- Colors: Navy and gold
- Slogan: "You Can Succeed"
- Sports: Baseball, football, basketball, tennis, volleyball, etc.
- Mascot: Warrior
- Nickname: DNHS
- Newspaper: The W. (not in print)
- Website: www.dnhigh.org

Del Norte High School or DNHS, located in Crescent City, California, is a public high school educating students from grades 9 through 12. It is the only regular public high school in Del Norte County. In 2008 DNHS was accredited for six years (through 2014) by the Western Association of Schools and Colleges. The principal, as of 2021, is Alison Eckart, and the dean of students/athletic director is Robert Hadfield.

In popular culture, Del Norte High School is the school attended by Laurel Sewell and her friends in the novel, Wings. Del Norte High School also became sister schools with another school in Rikuzentakata-shi, Iwate, Japan. Del Norte High School began an art club and cosplay club in 2018. The school takes turns with Takata high school each year of traveling their students to Japan and Takata's students the next year.

As of 2013, it was one of five schools in California offering classes in the Yurok language. Tolowa language classes have been taught "for many years."

== Notable alumni ==
- Eunice Bommelyn (Tolowa), Class of 1947, Tolowa language proponent, Tolowa cultural advocate and historian for the Smith River Rancheria.
- Buck Pierce, Class of 2000, professional football player (Canadian Football League)
- Cody Hoffman, Class of 2009, American Football player
- Brian D. Tripp (Karuk), sculptor, poet, mixed-media artist, educator
