= Fort Dick, California =

Unincorporated community in California, United States

- Unincorporated community census-designated place
- Location of Fort Dick in Del Norte County, California.
- Coordinates: 41°52′04″N 124°08′56″W
- Country: United States
- State: California
- County: Del Norte

Government
  - State Senate: Mike McGuire (D)
  - State Assembly: Chris Rogers (D)
  - U.S. House of Representatives: Jared Huffman (D)
- Elevation: 52 ft (16 m)

Population (2020)
  - Total: 912
- Time zone: UTC-8 (Pacific (PST))
  - Summer (DST): UTC-7 (PDT)
- ZIP codes: 95538 (homes - 95531)
- Area code: 707
- GNIS feature ID: 223696

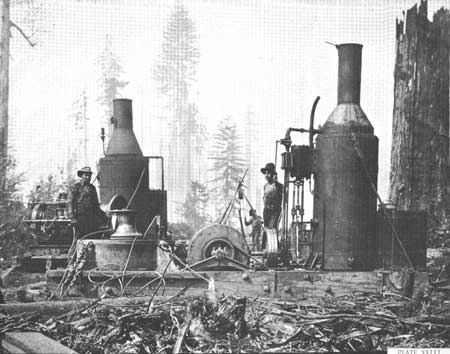
From the book Redwood National Forest, Plate XXIII

Fort Dick (Tolowa: Mvn-des-chuu-dvn) is a small unincorporated community and census-designated place (CDP) in rural Del Norte County, California, United States. Fort Dick is approximately five miles (eight kilometers) north of Crescent City, California, and around 15 mi (24 km) south of the California–Oregon state line. Its population is 912 as of the 2020 census, up from 588 from the 2010 census. It is located on the U.S. Route 101 corridor on the Redwood Coast. A post office was set up in 1917.

== Etymology ==
Fort Dick Landing dates back to the Civil War era and was named after a settler's log house "fort" built by Whites to defend from the Indians. In 1888 a shake and shingle mill was moved there and the place renamed Newburg by the Bertsch brothers, who owned the mill. With the establishment of the post office in 1896, the old name was revived.

== History ==
=== Pre-Settler contact ===
The heavily forested coast territory surrounding Fort Dick was occupied and used by the Tolowa and Yurok tribes of Native Americans.

=== Jedediah Smith's party reaches Lake Earl ===
Historical records state that a party travelling with Jedediah Smith entered the area of Fort Dick and skirted the eastern edge of Lake Earl between June 14 to 16, 1828. During this time, not only did they explore the area, but they made clear contact, including trading and engaging in commerce with the Tolowa Indians on the 15th. Jedidiah Smith's party "skirted" the eastern shore of Lake Earl. Since his party was there in 1828, it predates the events that led the settler or farmer who owned the land called "Russell's Prairie" (later Fort Dick) by about twenty-five to thirty years.

"On June 14 the company pushed up the beach until they struck a 'low neck of land running into the sea where there was plenty of clover and grass for our horses' and camped. The trappers, during the day's march, had been compelled to take to the sea for several hundred yards at a time, 'the swells some times would be as high as the horses backs.' The company remained on the south bank of Elk Creek on the 15th, while several hunters went out. One of them killed a buck elk 'weighing 695 lbs. neat weight.' A number of Tolowa came in bringing fish, clams, strawberries, and camas roots, which were purchased. The company rode out early on the 16th. Striking to the north northwest, they crossed a neck of land skirting the ocean. Considerable difficulty was encountered in getting the horses across Elk Creek, and they were compelled 'to make a pen on the bank to force them across.' The Mountain Men on the 16th camped on the wooded flats south of Lake Earl. Skirting the eastern margin of Lake Earl, the trappers camped three nights in Section 27, between the lake and Kings Valley."

The camp site of June 14 was on Elk Creek, one-fourth of a mile west of the junction of U.S. 101 and the Elk Valley road. Exactly one month later, while eating breakfast the morning of July 14, 1828, Jedediah's party was attacked by at least one hundred Native American Indians. Everyone in the party except for Jedediah and two companions died in the ambush. They escaped and headed directly to Fort Vancouver.

=== Shipwrecks near Fort Dick and Crescent City ===
The coastal waters near Crescent City and north are notoriously treacherous. Over the years, there have been many ships sunk in the ocean close to Fort Dick and Crescent City.

- 1850 - Paragon sunk
- 1851 - Tarquin
- 1855 - Steamer America burned in the harbor at Crescent City en route to Oregon and Washington
- 1865 - The Steamer Brother Jonathan hit an uncharted reef near Point St. George.
- 1941 - SS Emidio, an oil tanker, was shelled and torpedoed by a Japanese submarine. This was the first ship sunk by the Japanese off the American Pacific coast in World War II.

== Demographics ==
Historical population
Census	Pop.	Note	%±
2020	912		—
U.S. Decennial Census; 1850–1870 1880-1890; 1900 1910 1920; 1930 1940 1950; 1960 1970 1980; 1990 2000 2010

Fort Dick first appeared as a census-designated place in the 2020 United States census.

Fort Dick CDP, California – Racial and ethnic composition Note: the US Census treats Hispanic/Latino as an ethnic category. This table excludes Latinos from the racial categories and assigns them to a separate category. Hispanics/Latinos may be of any race.
Race / Ethnicity (NH = Non-Hispanic)	Pop 2020	2020
White alone (NH)	669	73.36%
Black or African American alone (NH)	1	0.11%
Native American or Alaska Native alone (NH)	102	11.18%
Asian alone (NH)	10	1.10%
Native Hawaiian or Pacific Islander alone (NH)	0	0.00%
Other race alone (NH)	7	0.77%
Mixed race or Multiracial (NH)	50	5.48%
Hispanic or Latino (any race)	73	8.00%
Total	912	100.00%

The 2020 United States census reported that Fort Dick had a population of 912. The population density was 283.5 inhabitants per square mile (109.5/km^{2}). The racial makeup of Fort Dick was 677 (74.2%) White, 1 (0.1%) African American, 103 (11.3%) Native American, 12 (1.3%) Asian, 0 (0.0%) Pacific Islander, 34 (3.7%) from other races, and 85 (9.3%) from two or more races. Hispanic or Latino of any race were 73 persons (8.0%).

The whole population lived in households. There were 357 households, out of which 71 (19.9%) had children under the age of 18 living in them, 185 (51.8%) were married-couple households, 32 (9.0%) were cohabiting couple households, 60 (16.8%) had a female householder with no partner present, and 80 (22.4%) had a male householder with no partner present. 92 households (25.8%) were one person, and 48 (13.4%) were one person aged 65 or older. The average household size was 2.55. There were 231 families (64.7% of all households).

The age distribution was 185 people (20.3%) under the age of 18, 44 people (4.8%) aged 18 to 24, 216 people (23.7%) aged 25 to 44, 256 people (28.1%) aged 45 to 64, and 211 people (23.1%) who were 65 years of age or older. The median age was 46.0 years. For every 100 females, there were 91.6 males.

There were 393 housing units at an average density of 122.2 units per square mile (47.2 units/km^{2}), of which 357 (90.8%) were occupied. Of these, 291 (81.5%) were owner-occupied, and 66 (18.5%) were occupied by renters.

== Government ==
Fort Dick has very few autonomous governmental services and is largely under the rule of Del Norte County. The remainder of the unincorporated city is subject to various county, state, and federal agencies.

=== Education ===
Educational services in Fort Dick are provided by the Del Norte County Unified School District, in conjunction with the Del Norte County Office of Education. At 1,008 square miles (2,610 km^{2}), with over 4000 students, they accomplish this by utilizing an elaborate public school busing network. The many district buses service eleven schools: eight elementary, one middle school, one high school, and one alternative high school. Fort Dick is the home to only one of the district's eight elementary schools. Redwood Elementary is equipped to educate students from the K to 8th grades. The school has a student population of 425 students, with a 21.8 student to teacher ratio. People living in Fort Dick must use education facilities in neighboring Crescent City for anything higher than the elementary school level.

== Climate ==
This region experiences mild and dry summers, with no average monthly temperatures above 71.6 °F. According to the Köppen Climate Classification system, Fort Dick has a warm-summer Mediterranean climate (Csb).

Climate data for Fort Dick, California 141ft(43m) (1981-2010)
Month	Jan	Feb	Mar	Apr	May	Jun	Jul	Aug	Sep	Oct	Nov	Dec	Year
Mean daily maximum °F (°C)	53.7 (12.1)	55.4 (13.0)	56.5 (13.6)	58.4 (14.7)	61.4 (16.3)	63.8 (17.7)	65.8 (18.8)	66.2 (19.0)	66.2 (19.0)	63.4 (17.4)	57.1 (13.9)	53.3 (11.8)	60.1 (15.6)
Daily mean °F (°C)	47.5 (8.6)	48.7 (9.3)	49.3 (9.6)	50.9 (10.5)	53.9 (12.2)	58.4 (14.7)	58.6 (14.8)	59.0 (15.0)	57.9 (14.4)	55.2 (12.9)	50.7 (10.4)	47.2 (8.4)	53.1 (11.7)
Mean daily minimum °F (°C)	41.2 (5.1)	41.9 (5.5)	42.2 (5.7)	43.4 (6.3)	46.3 (7.9)	49.0 (9.4)	51.4 (10.8)	51.9 (11.1)	49.7 (9.8)	47.0 (8.3)	44.2 (6.8)	41.1 (5.1)	45.8 (7.7)
Average precipitation inches (mm)	10.84 (275)	9.59 (244)	9.24 (235)	5.94 (151)	3.71 (94)	2.03 (52)	0.35 (8.9)	0.56 (14)	1.11 (28)	4.66 (118)	10.23 (260)	13.86 (352)	72.12 (1,831.9)
Average relative humidity (%)	78.7	77.0	78.8	78.3	78.3	78.0	81.9	82.3	77.2	76.1	79.5	78.6	78.7
Average dew point °F (°C)	41.2 (5.1)	41.8 (5.4)	43.0 (6.1)	44.4 (6.9)	47.3 (8.5)	50.3 (10.2)	53.1 (11.7)	53.6 (12.0)	50.8 (10.4)	47.8 (8.8)	44.6 (7.0)	40.9 (4.9)	46.6 (8.1)
