= Upper Umpqua language =

Extinct Native American language formerly spoken in Oregon

(Upper) Umpqua
- Etnemitane
- Native to: United States
- Region: Oregon (Umpqua Valley)
- Ethnicity: Upper Umpqua
- Extinct: 1945
- Language family: Na-Dené: Athabaskan; Pacific Coast Athabaskan; (Upper) Umpqua

Language codes
- ISO 639-3: xup
- Glottolog: uppe1436
- Upper Umpqua is classified as Extinct by the UNESCO Atlas of the World's Languages in Danger.

Upper Umpqua is an extinct Athabaskan language formerly spoken along the south fork of the Umpqua River in west-central Oregon by Upper Umpqua (Etnemitane) people in the vicinity of modern Roseburg. It has been extinct for at least seventy years and little is known about it other than it belongs to the same Oregon Athabaskan cluster of Pacific Coast Athabaskan languages as the Lower Rogue River language, Upper Rogue River language and Chetco-Tolowa.

The most important documentation of Upper Umpqua is the extensive vocabulary obtained by Horatio Hale in 1841 (published in Hale 1846). Melville Jacobs and John P. Harrington were able to collect fragmentary data from the last speakers as late as the 1940s (Golla 2011:70-72). Although known to early explorers and settlers as Umpqua, the language is now usually called Upper Umpqua to distinguish it from the unrelated Oregon Coast Penutian language Lower Umpqua (Kuitsh or Siuslaw language) that was spoken closer to the coast in the same area.
