= Tatlatunne, California =

Former Native American settlement in California

Coordinates: 41°45′24″N 124°13′42″W

Tatlatunne (Tolowa: Taa-‘at-dvn) (Note: also, Kal-wa-natc-kuc-te-ne, Ta-a-te-ne, Ta-ah-tens, Ta-t'ea-tun, Ta-t'qla-tun, Ta-ta-ten, Ta-tla tun-ne, Tahahteens, Tahaten, and Tatqlaq-tun-tun-ne) is a former Tolowa settlement in Del Norte County, California, United States. It lay at the present location of Crescent City.
