= Yontocket, California =

Unincorporated community in California, United States

Yontocket yan’-daa-k’vt Burnt Ranch
- Unincorporated community
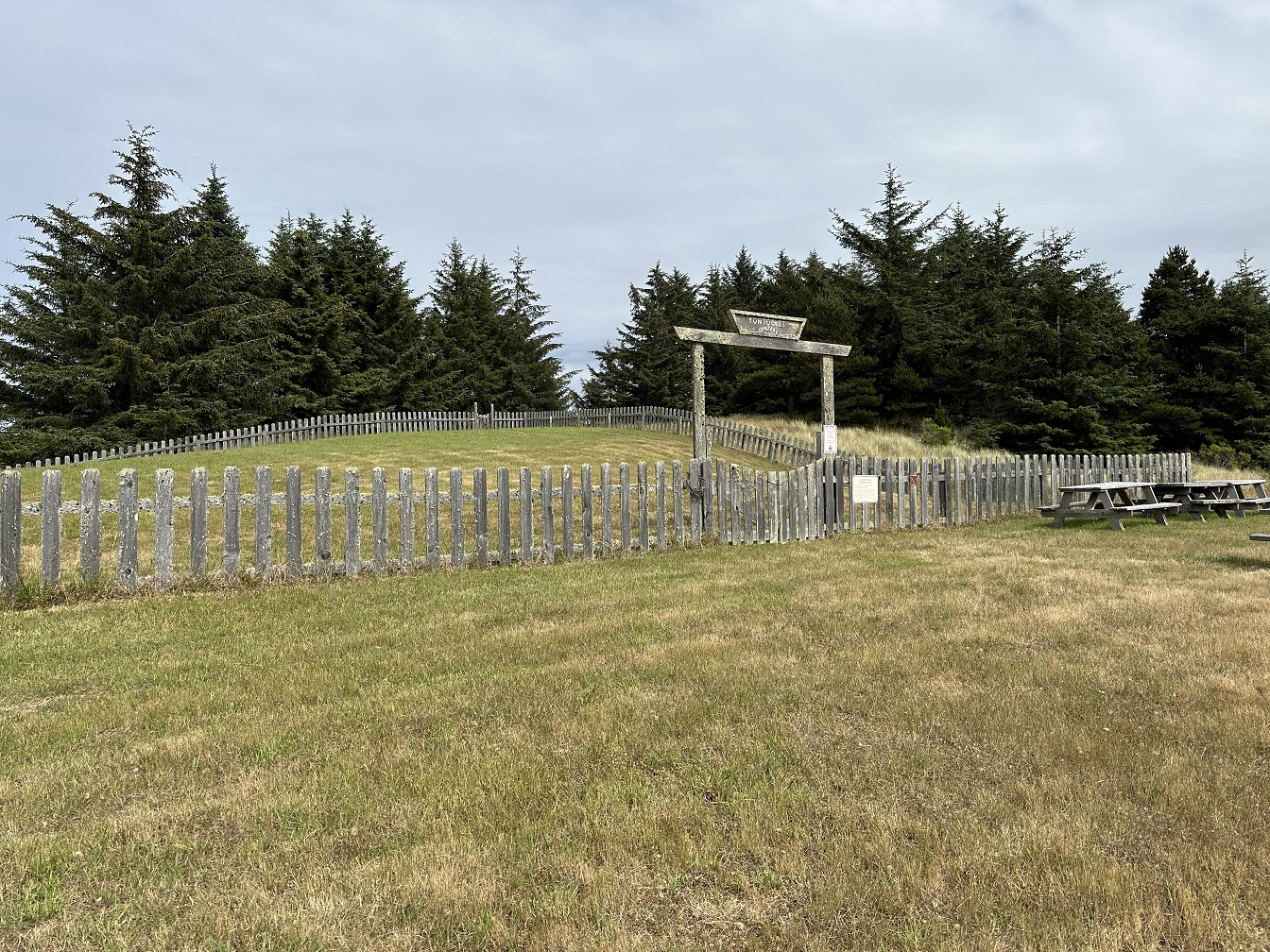

- Location in California Yontocket (the United States)
- Coordinates: 41°54′27″N 124°11′56″W
- Country: United States
- State: California
- County: Del Norte County
- Elevation: 30 ft (9 m)

Yontocket (Tolowa: Yan’-daa-k’vt) is an unincorporated community in Del Norte County, California , United States,located 3 miles (4.8 km) west-southwest of Smith River, at an elevation of 26 feet (8 m) alongside Yontocket Slough.

== Yontocket Historic District ==
A Tolowa village named Hawunkwut was located in the dunes above the Yontocket Slough. Nearby is the Yontocket Historic District, an archeological site of the Indigenous peoples of California, added to the National Register of Historic Places #73000400 in 1973, commemorating the Yontoket Massacre of Tolowa people by white settlers in 1853. The dead were thrown in the slough, and the village burnt, after which it was known as Burnt Ranch (not to be confused with a town of the same name in nearby Trinity County).

== Yontocket Slough ==
Yontocket Slough was once the main drainage channel of the Smith River, but about 900 years ago, the river abandoned the channel. The 1856 map of the area shows the slough (then named "Ottawa Slough") tidally connected to the Smith River and the upstream Tryon Creek flowing south into Lake Earl but dune migration has cut off this connection. By 1942, the slough had begun to isolate from tidal influences. Ponds in the immediate area may be other channel remnants. Before the 1942 construction of Pala Road, dividing the slough into a lower (near the Smith River at the northern end) and an upper part, anadromous salmonids fish used the approximately 3.5 miles (5.6 km) waterway to migrate between the river and upstream spawning grounds. The slough has silted approximately 16 inches (41 cm) since the 1850s. Presently, the slough is isolated from the river at all but high water events and it is fed by rainwater and runoff; Pala Road routinely floods during most of the winter and spring.

In 1881, Yontocket Slough was described as "literally alive with salmon" even after years of commercial harvest. In December 1861, an early fishery, Woodbury's cannery and 400 barrels of salmon were washed out by the Noachian Deluge. Continual harvesting in excess of 50 tons per year however, led to the decline of the fishery which was closed to commercial take during the 1930s. The Christmas flood of 1964 added large quantities of grey silt on top of the channel sediments, reducing the depth, changing the flora and further reducing fish habitat. The silt was drag line dredged in 1985 and cattle were excluded from the stream bed and fringing verge by 2002 after which adult coastal cutthroat trout were found in the slough. By 2007 crews from the California Conservation Corps had planted more than 1,000 Sitka spruce and red alders as well as 500 willow sprigs and 3,000 feet (910 m) of exclusion fencing.

The lower 2,500 feet (760 m) of the slough were purchased by the California Department of Parks and Recreation in the 1970s and cattle grazing halted until the 1990s when the grazed short areas were used for forage habitat by Aleutian geese. Other native animals seen at the slough include the northern red-legged frog, great egret and black-crowned night heron. The Yontocket satyr ringlet butterfly was named for Yontocket, where the first one was caught.

Invasive reed canary grass surrounds the slough, floats in it as mats, but rarely occurs below the 4.8 feet (1.5 m) mark which is dominated by native yellow pond-lily because flooding the canary grass 24 inches (61 cm) during the June growing season prevents growth and establishment. The wetlands are fringed by patches of Sitka spruce and willows.

== Public access ==
Yontocket Slough and adjacent Tolowa Dunes State Park are open for public access for hiking, wildlife watching and seasonal hunting activities, and coastal access.

== See also ==
- Bicknell, S. H. 1991. Lake Earl Project presettlement vegetation. Final Report prepared in fulfillment of Interagency Number 4–100–8401, dated 13 May 1988 and in partial fulfillment of the conditions of Interagency Agreement Number 88–05–007, dated 1 July 1989 and amended 1 November 1989, between California Department of Parks and Recreation and Humboldt State University. Arcata, CA.
- Scriven, Joseph. 1999. Yontocket Slough and Tryon Slough Assessment for Improvement of Anadromy, FG 7080 IF, Report to the California Department of Fish and Game.

== Climate ==
This region experiences warm (but not hot) and dry summers, with no average monthly temperatures above 71.6 °F. According to the Köppen Climate Classification system, Yontocket has a warm-summer Mediterranean climate, abbreviated "Csb" on climate maps.
