= Eunice Bommelyn =

American historian (1927–2012)

Eunice Xash-wee-tes-na Henry Bommelyn (February 6, 1927 – April 23, 2012) was an American Tolowa cultural advocate, Tolowa language proponent, and tribal historian. Bommelyn was the last living person to speak Tolowa as a native first language; Bommelyn led the effort to revive fluency and teach the language. She uncovered and recorded the genealogy of the Tolowa from the present to the 1790s. Her genealogical records are used to determine the membership and enrollment of the Smith River Rancheria, the federally recognized tribe of Tolowa people in Del Norte County, California. Bommelyn was the mother of Loren Bommelyn, a ceremonial leader and basket weaver.

== Early life ==
Bommelyn was born Eunice Henry on February 6, 1927, in the village of Nii~-lii~-chvn-dvn, located on South Bank Road along Smith River in Del Norte County, California. She was the youngest of nine children born to Billie Henry and Alice Charley Henry. Her maternal grandparents were Westbrook and Delilah Charley and her paternal grandparents were Ik-fu-yu-wan and Jane Henry. Her mother, Alice Henry, required that she attend high school. In 1947, she became the first of her nine siblings to complete high school upon her graduation from Del Norte High School in Crescent City, California. She found a job within the local lily bulb farming industry after high school. There she met her future husband, James Bommelyn, who had moved to Del Norte from Trinity County, California, to find work. James Bommelyn reportedly jumped on her truck and refused to leave until she agreed to go on a date. The couple married in 1950 and had four children.

== Preservation of Tolowa heritage ==
Eunice Bommelyn joined the Inter-Tribal Council of California (ITCC). She was highly active in the preservation of Tolowa customs and language. She reintroduced the Nee-dash dance, which had been outlawed in 1923 along with other Tolowa indigenous religious ceremonies. The Nee-dash dance is now taught to Tolowa children. Bommelyn purchased the Jane Hostatlas allotment along the Smith River, which is still used for Tolowa ceremonies as of 2012. She taught Tolowa language classes. Bommelyn also handmade the only fishing nets which are still utilized by the Smith River Rancheria.

Bommelyn publicly opposed the Indian termination policy, a federal policy which advocated the assimilation of Native Americans and Native American tribes into mainstream society while eliminating traditional customs. A tribal historian and genealogist, Bommelyn traced the genealogy of the Tolowa as far back as the 1790s. Her genealogy research led to the end of a Tolowa taboo which had traditionally prohibited speaking a deceased person's name. Her genealogical records are used as the basis to determine current membership in the Smith River Rancheria.

On April 7, 2012, Bommelyn was honored by the 5th Annual Humboldt State California Big Time and Social Gathering, a gathering of five California Native American tribes, for her contributions to the preservation of Tolowa language and customs.

== Death and tribal remembrance ==
Eunice Bommelyn died in Crescent City, California, on April 23, 2012, at the age of 85. Her family cut their hair to sever a connection between themselves and her spirit. She was buried by her grandchildren at the How-On-Quet Indian Cemetery, which overlooks the Smith River. The Tolowa did not perform the Nee-dash dance in 2012, in memory of Bommelyn.
