= Tolowa Dunes State Park =

State Park in Del Norte County, California

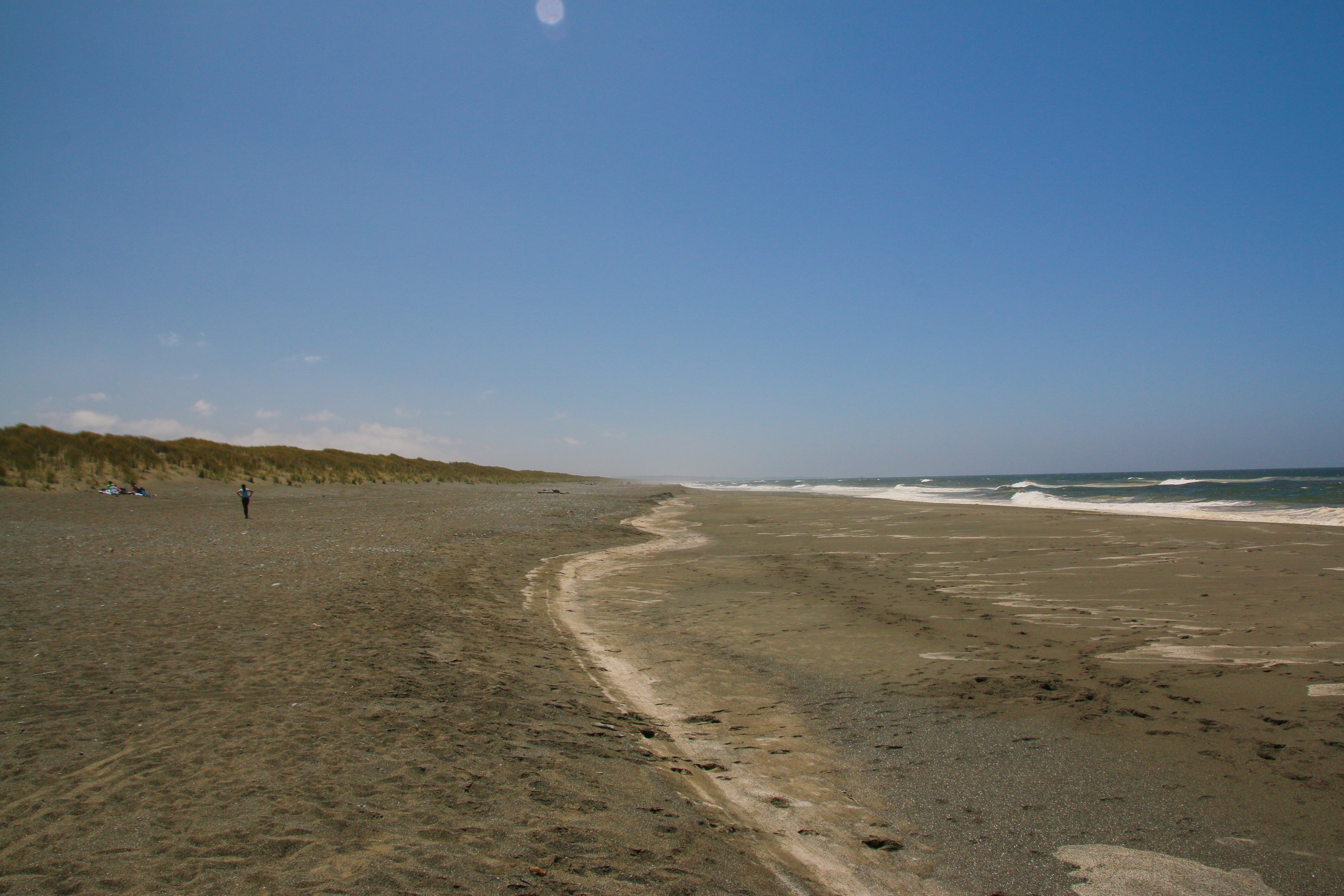
- Tolowa Dunes State Park, August 2016

- Location within California Location within the United States
- Location: Del Norte County, California, United States
- Nearest city: Crescent City
- Coordinates: 41°52′N 124°12′W
- Area: 4,000 acres (16 km^{2})
- Established: 1925
- Governing body: California Department of Parks and Recreation

Tolowa Dunes State Park is a 4,000-acre (16 km^{2}) California State Park located in Del Norte County, on the North Coast of California.

== Facilities ==
The park surrounds the 6,100-acre (25 km^{2}) Lake Earl Wildlife Area including Lake Earl and Lake Tolowa, and encompasses a significant portion of the relatively large adjacent coastal plain around them including Yontocket, California. Tolowa Dunes State Park and the adjacent Lake Earl Wildlife Area is a sanctuary for bird life including California quail, ruffed grouse, canvasback, and western grebe. It is easily reached by US 101, and is just north of Crescent City. The Pala Road parking lot in the north part of the park includes access to a short trail crossing Yontocket Slough to reach an historic cemetery. The East Pond Loop Trail leaves the cemetery offering visitors a ridge trail and opportunities to enjoy views of wildlife using the ponds and wetlands. The south end of the park offers a 2.5-mile (4.0 km) round trip on the Sweetwater Creek Trail accessed from a parking lot at the end of Sand Hill Road.

== History ==
The name refers to the Tolowa people, an indigenous tribe whose homeland was in the area, and relatively undisturbed previous to American colonization in the 1850s. Their oral history includes stories of tectonic activity along the Cascadia subduction zone which has caused local sea level changes at intervals of several centuries. The park remains within a tsunami hazard zone and the plain may support fresh water wetlands or Sitka Spruce forests following uplift events and salt marsh or inundated shellfish beds following subsidence events.

== See also ==
- California coastal prairie
