= Khwunrghunme, California =

Wehlkwew Xwvn’-ghvn-me’ (Tolowa)
- Former settlement
- Location in California
- Coordinates: 41°32′04″N 124°04′39″W
- Country: United States
- State: California
- County: Del Norte County
- Elevation: 33 ft (10 m)

Wehlkwew is a former Yurok settlement in Del Norte County, California, United States, south of the mouth of Klamath River. It lays at an elevation of 33 feet (10 m). Until circa 1855, it was the site of the tribe's annual First Salmon Ceremony. In the modern day, it is used as a ceremonial site by the aforementioned Yurok tribe.

The settlement was known as Xwvn’-ghvn-me’ in Tolowa, also anglicized as Khwunrghunme.
