= Pacific Coast Athabaskan languages =

Subfamily of Athabaskan languages

Pacific Coast Athabascan
- Geographic distribution: California, Oregon
- Linguistic classification: Dené–Yeniseian?: Na-Dené; Athabaskan–Eyak; Athabaskan; Pacific Coast Athabascan
- Subdivisions: California †; Oregon †; Kwalhioqua-Clatskanie †

Language codes
- Glottolog: paci1277

Pacific Coast Athabaskan is a geographical and possibly genealogical grouping of the Athabaskan language family.

== California Athabaskan ==
- California Athabaskan
  - †Hupa (dining'-xine:wh, a.k.a. Hoopa-Chilula)
    - dialects:
      - Hupa
      - Tsnungwe
        - tse:ning-xwe
        - tł'oh-mitah-xwe
      - Chilula-Whilkut
        - Chilula
        - Whilkut
  - †Mattole–Bear River
    - dialects:
      - Mattole
      - Bear River
  - †Wailaki ("Eel River", spoken by the Eel River Athapaskan peoples)
    - dialects:
      - Sinkyone
      - Wailaki
      - Nongatl
      - Lassik
  - †Cahto (a.k.a. Kato) (sometimes included in Eel River)

Often the Mattole and Wailaki-speaking groups together are called Southern Athapaskans. Their languages were similar to each other, but differed from the northern California tribes whose languages were also part of the Athapaskan family. They are not to be confused with the Apachean peoples (the Apache and Navajo)—also known as Southern Athabascans—of the Southwestern United States and Northern Mexico, who speak the Southern Athabaskan languages.

The family has also been called Californian Dene.

== Oregon Athabaskan ==
- Oregon Athabaskan
  - †Upper Umpqua (a.k.a. Etnemitane)
  - †Lower Rogue River (a.k.a. Tututni, Coquille)
    - dialects:
      - Upper Coquille
        - Coquille (a.k.a. Mishikwutinetunne)
        - Flores Creek (a.k.a. Kosotshe, Kusu'me, Lukkarso)
      - Tututni
        - Tututunne
        - Naltunnetunne
        - Mikwunutunne (a.k.a. Mikonotunne)
        - Joshua (a.k.a. Chemetunne)
        - Sixes (a.k.a. Kwatami)
        - Pistol River (a.k.a. Chetleshin)
        - Wishtenatin (a.k.a. Khwaishtunnetunnne)
      - Euchre Creek (a.k.a. Yukichetunne)
      - Chasta Costa (a.k.a. Illinois River, Chastacosta, Chasta Kosta)
  - †Upper Rogue River (a.k.a. Galice–Applegate)
    - dialects:
      - Galice (a.k.a. Taltushtuntede)
      - Applegate (a.k.a. Nabiltse, Dakubetede)
  - †Chetco-Tolowa
    - dialects:
      - Chetco
      - Smith River (a.k.a. Tolowa)
      - Siletz Dee-ni (modern Chetco-Tolowa variant with word from Chasta Costa, Applegate, Galice, Rogue River, and other members of the Confederated Tribes of Siletz Indians)

Linguists differ on the classification of the Lower Rogue River, Upper Rogue River, and Chetco-Tolowa branches as being either separate languages, or dialects of one macrolanguage, comprising a dialect continuum centered on the Lower Rogue River dialect group with the Chetco-Tolowa and Upper Rogue River groups being peripheral. The latter view is common among tribal elders and language revitalizationists, who note a high degree of mutual intelligibility and shared cultural identity. In the absence of a single, unambiguous English name for the dialect group, some learner-speakers refer to it in English as Nuu-wee-ya', an endonym common to all three varieties meaning "our language".

== Bibliography ==
- See: Athabaskan languages#Bibliography
- Don Macnaughtan (10 February 2014). "Oregon Athapaskan Languages: Bibliography of the Athapaskan Languages of Oregon".
