= Yontoket massacre =

1853 massacre of Tolowa people in California, USA

The Yontocket massacre or Burnt Ranch massacre was an 1853 massacre of Tolowa people at the village of Yontocket (Tolowa: Yan'-daa-k'vt), northwestern California, during the California genocide. Over 450 people were killed by White American pioneer settlers from the town of Crescent City, and it remains one of the deadliest mass killings in California's history.

== Before the event ==
The Tolowa Tribe, or the Taa-laa-wa Dee-ni', is a Native American tribe from northwestern California and southern Oregon.

In the spring of 1853, a group of prospectors headed by a man by the name of "California Jack" started from Crescent City on a prospecting journey. They planned to go to a place near the Smith River. Not long after, a Native American was spotted in town carrying a pistol with the name "California Jack" engraved on it. Believing that the prospectors had been killed by the Native Americans, a group of townspeople attacked the Native Americans at Battery Point. They killed the Native American who had the pistol and several others in the area. They immediately began to assemble a search party to look for the men's camp and bodies. When they found them, they became increasingly angry.

== The massacre ==
After the killing of the Native Americans at Battery Point, a large number of the Tolowa survivors fled to a rancheria (a small Native American settlement) close to the mouth of Smith's River. The rancheria was known as Yontocket Ranch. A group of people ready to fight was formed. The manner of the attack showed that someone in the group had knowledge of the country near the ranch. Yontocket was the location of the tribe's arrival on the coast, and it was a village on the south side of the Smith River. The Needash is the Tolowa's feather dance that occurs twice a year. This Needash was after the fall harvest. Native Americans gathered from the surrounding areas to celebrate their religion. It was common for the tribes in the area (Chetko, Pistol River, Tolowa, Tututni, and some Rogue River tribes) to meet at the Center of the Tolowa World, Yontocket, at both the summer and the winter solstices. On the third night of the ten-night gathering, the town mob invaded the village, and the massacre began.

When the men found out where the survivors of the Battery Point Massacre were located, they formed a thirty-three-man company. The men trapped the Indians by encircling them. Just when the sun came up on the eastern horizon, they opened fire at Yontocket. The Indians immediately came running out of their huts, armed with their bows and arrows, fighting for their lives. Their primitive weapons were no match for the modern weapons of the men.

The massacre was conducted by a "company", a militia organized by American citizens of Crescent City. At the time of the attack, the Tolowa had been engaged in a prayer ceremony.

Many of the Indians attempted to escape. The Indian men's screams were intermingled with the screams of the women and children, which caused even more confusion among the Indians. Hundreds of people were killed in the attack, but the men were not done yet. An eyewitness said, "The people got all around them… Every time someone go out, never come back in… they set fire to the house, the Indians' house. You could see them just cutting heads off. They stick them things into them; pretty soon they pick them up and throw them right into the fire. Some of 'em tried to get away, run down the slough. Soon as they get down there, if they don't get 'em right away, they get 'em from the other side when they come up. Shoot 'em right there, waiting for them."

== After the massacre ==
After the attack, 450 to 500 Tolowa people were recorded as dead. The attackers built a huge fire and threw almost everything the Indians had into it. They threw the Indians' sacred ceremonial dresses into it, and they even threw babies, some of whom were still alive, into the fire too. Finally, Burnett's men burned Yontocket to the ground, and only a few Indians were left alive. The men reported no intentional kills of women and children. So many victims were incinerated, submerged, or had floated away that the attackers could not obtain a complete body count. Sources estimated that only 150 lives were lost that morning. This may have been an understatement, and Tolowa sources insist that 600 people were massacred at Yontocket. This is ranked as one of the most lethal massacres in U.S. history.

Because their homes had burned down, the place received the name "Burnt Ranch." The Yontocket Massacre decimated the cultural center of the Tolowa peoples. The Natives from the surrounding areas would gather there for their celebrations and discussions. The survivors of the massacre were forced to move to the village north of Smith's River called Howonquet (Xaa-wan’-k’wvt). The slaughtering of the Tolowa people continued for some years. They were seemingly always caught at their Needash celebrations. These massacres caused some unrest, which led in part to the Rogue River Indian War.

Many Tolowa people were incarcerated at Battery Point in 1855 to prevent them from joining an uprising led by their chief. Adding to the number of dead from the Yontocket Massacre and the Battery Point Attack were many more deaths in the following years. These occurred in the Chetko Massacre, with 24 dead; the Smith Creek Massacre, with 7 dead; the Howonquet Massacre, with 70 dead; and the Stundossun Massacre, with 300 dead. In total, 902 Tolowa Native Americans were killed in 7 years. There are no records that any of the perpetrators were ever held accountable.

Little or no loss of life was reported on the American side.

10:14 PM

== See also ==
- List of massacres in California
- Achulet massacre
