= Peak Eight =

Mountain in United States of America

- Location within California Location within the United States

Highest point
- Elevation: 5,188 ft (1,581 m) NGVD 29
- Coordinates: 41°33′01″N 123°46′34″W

Geography
- Location: Del Norte County, California, U.S.
- Parent range: Siskiyou Mountains

Peak Eight is a summit in Del Norte County, California, sacred to the Yurok, Karok and Tolowa tribes.
