= Tolowa Dee-niʼ Nation =

Coordinates: 41°57′09″N 124°12′23″W

Total population
- 1,900+ enrolled members 285 enrolled (1995)

Regions with significant populations
- United States (California)

Languages
- English, Tolowa

Related ethnic groups
- other Tolowa people, Tututni and Chetco peoples

The Tolowa Dee-niʼ Nation, previously known as Smith River Rancheria, is a federally recognized tribe of Tolowa people in Del Norte County, California. They are Athabascan people, distantly related to northern Athabascans of eastern Alaska and western Canada, as well as the Apache and Navajo peoples of the American Southwest.

As of the 2020 Census the population of this group was 423. Tolowa people are also part of other federally recognized tribes in northern California and Oregon.

== Government ==
The Tolowa Dee-niʼ Nation is headquartered in Smith River, California. They are governed by a democratically elected, seven-member tribal council. Their current tribal administration is as follows:

- Chairperson: Jeri Lynn Thompson
- Vice Chairperson: Scott Sullivan
- Secretary: Debbie Boardman
- Treasurer: Jaytuk Steinruck
- Councilmember: Dr. Joseph Giovannetti
- Councilmember: Amanda O'Connell
- Councilmember: Dorothy Wait
- Executive Director: Troy Ralstin

== Reservation ==
Map of Smith River Rancheria and nearby reservations (In orange.)

The Tolowa Dee-niʼ Nation is a federally recognized tribe, which owns 805 acres of land on or adjacent to its reservation in Del Norte County, north of Crescent City. The Tolowa Dee-niʼ Nation was established in 1906; their land used to consist of only 30-acres. The nearest community is Smith River, while the nearest incorporated city is Brookings, Oregon, about 10 miles to the north. In 1862, the US Government established the Smith River Reservation, which consisted of 16,000 acres and which was abandoned by the U.S. in 1868.

== Economic development ==
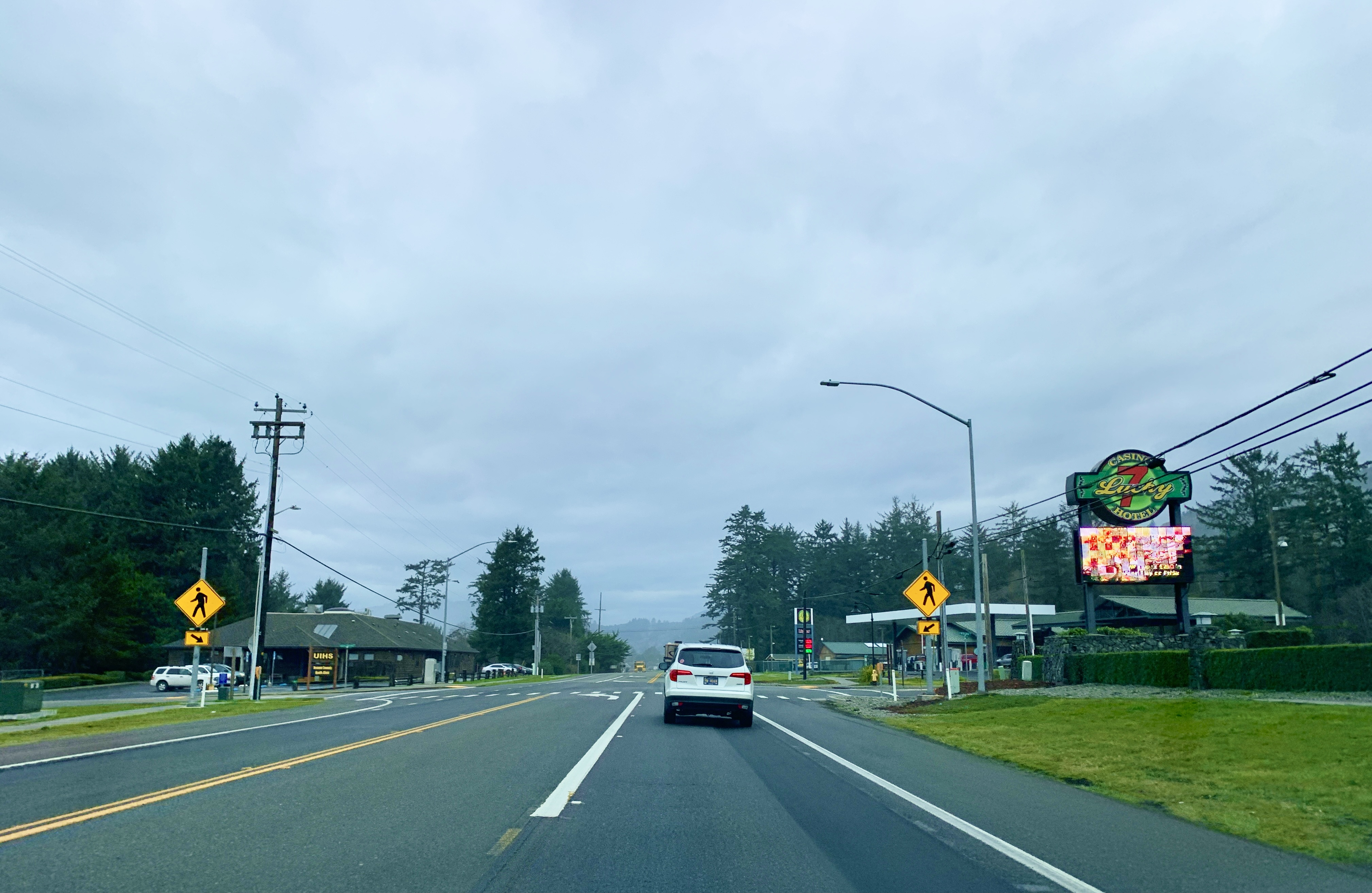
Tolowa Dee-niʼ Nation casino sign

The Tolowa Dee-niʼ Nation (Smith River Rancheria) owns and operates the Lucky 7 Casino and Xaa-wan'-k'wvt Village Resort in Smith River, California.

== Notable citizens ==
- Eunice Bommelyn, Tolowa language proponent, cultural advocate, genealogist, and historian.
- Loren Bommelyn, basket maker, traditionalist
- Alicia Guerrero, para-athlete
