= Achulet massacre =

1854 massacre of indigenous Tolowa

Coordinates: 41.8256693°N 124.1886932°W

The Achulet Massacre refers to the 1854 massacre of an estimated 65-150 Tolowa Indians at the hands of European-American settlers. The incident occurred at the village of Achulet (Tolowa: ‘Ee-chuu-le’), near Lake Earl in [what is now Del Norte County Del Norte County), California. During the same time (from 1845 to 1855), the Tolowa people were forcibly relocated to what they refer to as the “Klamath Concentration Camp”, only to later be relocated to Indian reservations in Oregon in 1860 after the Rogue River Wars. The village of Achulet was developed into a huge shipping and trade center. Its development can be attributed to the extensive migration of Europeans into California from 1845 to 1855, most of whom were prompted to travel there by the California gold rush. However, the arrival of these Easterners resulted in a visible decline of the Tolowa population. In addition to genocide, the decline in Tolowa population can also be attributed to contracting diseases that were introduced by the European-American settlers.

The Anglo people were also eager to acquire land occupied by the Tolowa. This led to a very brutal encounter between the two groups. An Indian was suspected of stealing the horse of a white man. In response, armed whites hid in the brush near the village at night, agreeing not to shoot until the Tolowa left their dwellings in the morning. At daybreak the whites fired as soon as someone emerged into the village, and then the men, women, and children of the village were "shot down as fast as the whites could reload their guns". Some Tolowa tried to escape into Lake Earl; armed whites pursued them, shooting whenever the Tolowa showed above the waterline. The attackers reported killing 65 Indians, but this tally did not include victims whose bodies sank in the lake.

After the attack, the settlers renamed the village as Pay Way, after Old Pay Way, one of the few Tolowa survivors.

== See also ==
- List of massacres in the United States
- Yontoket massacre
