= Tolowa traditional narratives =

Tolowa traditional narratives include myths, legends, tales, and oral histories preserved by the Tolowa people of Smith River area of northwestern California and southwestern Oregon.

Tolowa oral literature has been comparatively little documented. It is likely to reflect affiliations with the traditions of northwestern California and the Northwest Coast region. (See also Traditional narratives (Native California).)

== On-Line Examples of Tolowa Narratives ==
- Myths and Legends of California and the Old Southwest by Katharine Berry Judson (1912)
- The North American Indian by Edward S. Curtis

== Sources for Tolowa Narratives ==
- Curtis, Edward S. 1907–1930. The North American Indian. 20 vols. Plimpton Press, Norwood, Massachusetts. (Four myths collected from Joe Hostler, vol. 13, pp. 199–201.)
- Drucker, Philip. 1937. "The Tolowa and Their Southwest Oregon Kin". University of California Publications in American Archaeology and Ethnology 36–221–300. Berkeley. (Brief note on mythology, p. 268.)
- DuBois, Cora A. 1932. "Tolowa Notes". American Anthropologist 34:248-262. (Two myths, including a tsunami story, collected from Agnes Mattz of Smith River in 1929.)
- Judson, Katharine Berry. 1912. Myths and Legends of California and the Old Southwest. A. C. McClurg, Chicago. (Flood-Theft of Fire myth, pp. 68–69.)
- Luthin, Herbert W. 2002. Surviving through the Days: A California Indian Reader. University of California Press, Berkeley. (Version of a tsunami/flood myth recorded in 1985, pp. 67–76.)
- Powers, Stephen. 1877. Tribes of California. Contributions to North American Ethnology, vol. 3. Government Printing Office, Washington, D.C. Reprinted with an introduction by Robert F. Heizer in 1976, University of California Press, Berkeley. (Three narratives, including Theft of Fire, pp. 69–71.)

== See also ==
- Loren Bommelyn
