= Eel River Athapaskan peoples =

Native American group in northwestern California, United States

Eel River Athabaskan
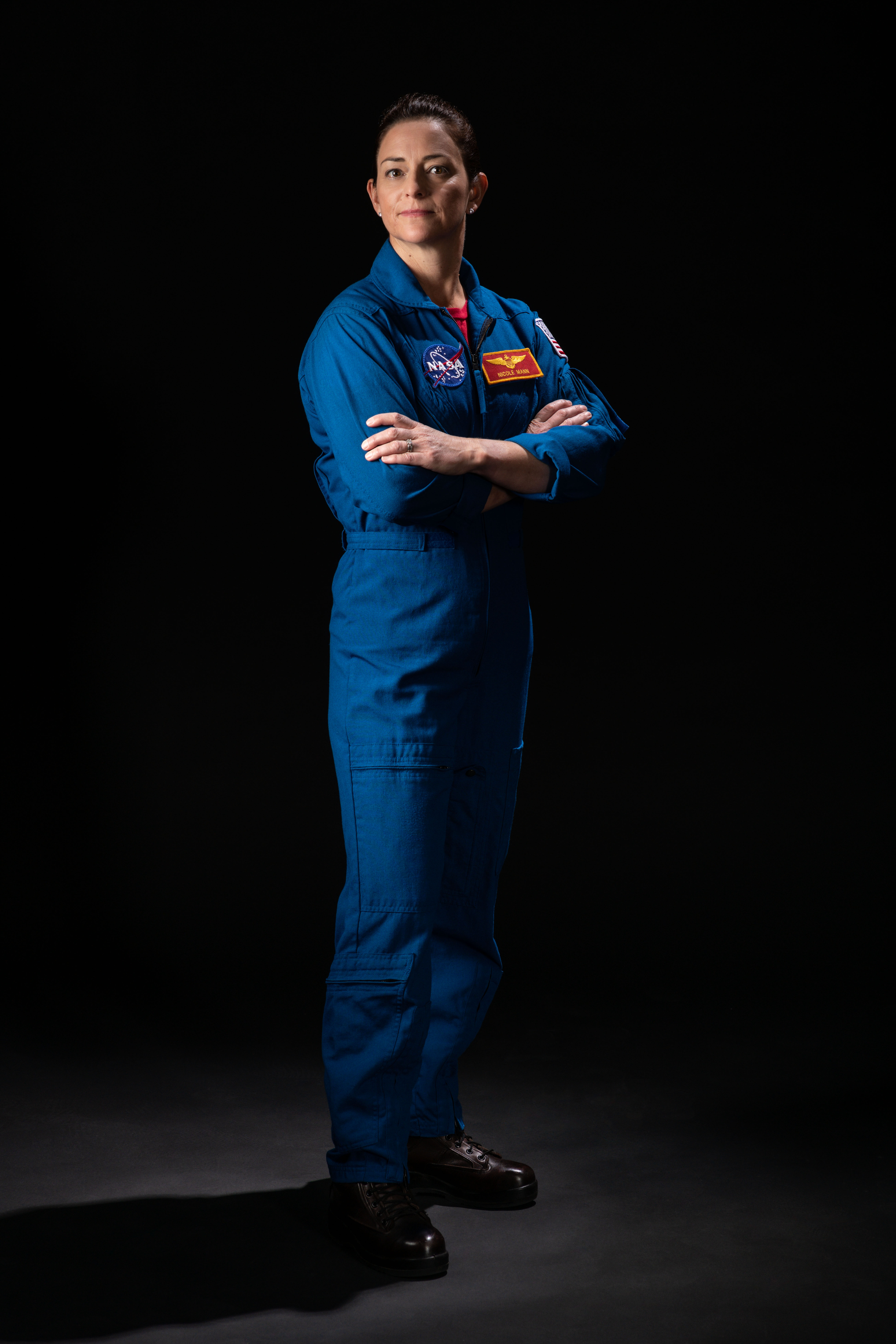
- Astronaut Nicole Mann (Wailaki), an Eel River Athabascan person

Regions with significant populations
- California

Languages
- English, Eel River/Wailaki

Religion
- Animism (historically), Christianity

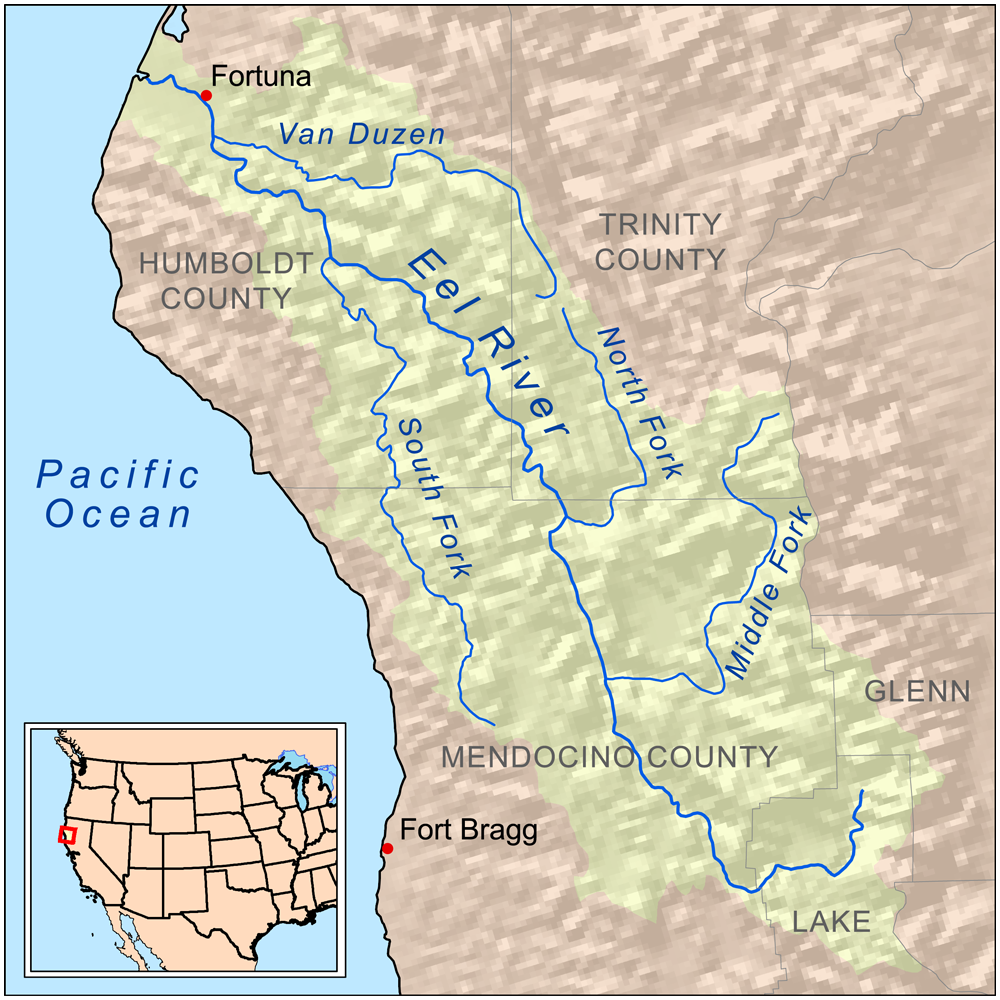
Map of the Eel River drainage basin

Athapaskan languages in California

The Eel River Athapaskans include the Wailaki, Lassik, Nongatl, and Sinkyone (Sinkine) groups of Native Americans that traditionally live in present-day Mendocino, Trinity, and Humboldt counties on or near the Eel River and Van Duzen River of northwestern California.

These groups speak dialects of the Wailaki language belonging to the Pacific Coast Athapaskan group of the Athapaskan language family which is prominently represented in Alaska, western Canada, and the southwestern U.S. Other related Athapaskan groups neighboring the Eel River Athapaskans included the Hupa-Whilkut-Chilula to the north, the Mattole on the coast to the west, and the Kato to the south.

The Whilkut, Nongatl and Lassik were essentially annihilated during the Bald Hills War in the 1860s.

Some Wailaki people are registered members of Round Valley Indian Tribes.

== Dialect groups ==
While the below groupings – Nongatl, Lassik, Wailaki, and Sinkyone – are often mentioned as political or tribal groupings, discussions with contemporary Wailaki by Thomas Keter, as well as Jerry Rohde's analysis of Pliny Earle Goddard's field notes, shows that these are dialectical groupings assigned names by ethnographers for the sake of convenience with little basis in the everyday lived experience of Wailaki themselves. The spelling of names in this article is very irregular, reflecting an attempted standardized orthography by Sally Anderson and spellings from Pliny Goddard, Clinton Hart Merriam, Martin Baumhoff, Alfred Kroeber, and others.

=== Nongatl ===
The Nongatl (Hupa word meaning "Athapaskan to the south") lived traditionally in the territory around the Van Duzen River, from its outlet on the Eel River to its headwaters near Dinsmore, California, and along Yager Creek and Larabee Creek (Elsasser 1978; Golla 2011). They had at least 35 villages.

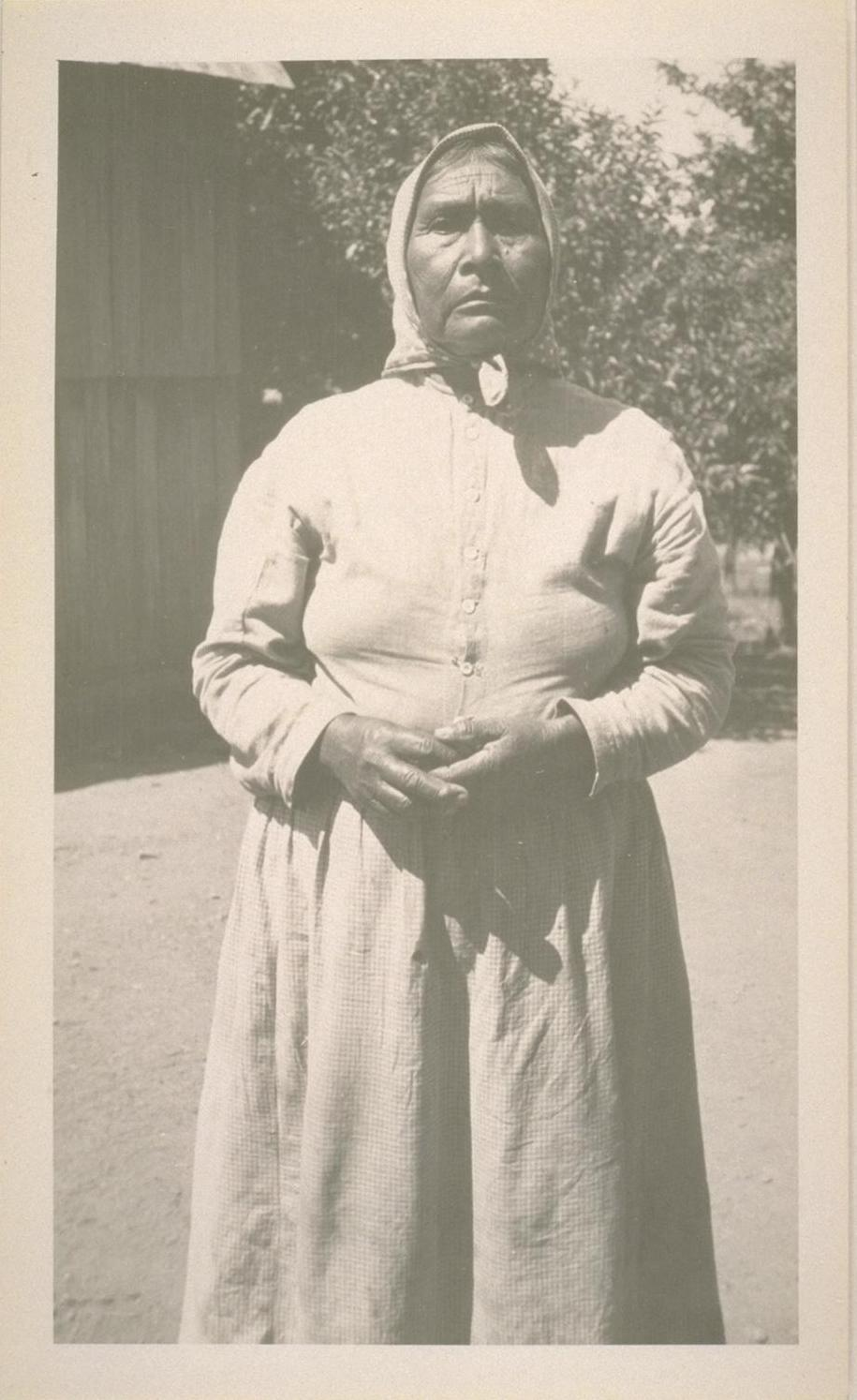
Lucy Young, a Lassik woman

=== Lassik ===
The Lassik (Las'-sik, the name of their last chief) had about 20 villages and occupied a portion of main Eel River south to Kekawaka Creek, and its east tributaries, Van Duzen River, Larabee, and Dobbyn creeks, as well the headwaters of the North Fork Eel River and Mad River. They had for neighbors toward the north the Whilkut inhabitants of the valley of Mad River and Redwood Creek; toward the east the Wintu of South Fork Trinity River; toward the south the Wailaki, from whom they were separated by Kekawaka Creek; toward the west the Sinkyone (Sinkine) on Southfork of Eel River. Their dialect resembles the Hupa in its morphology and the Wailaki in its phonology. The majority of them perished during the first few years of the occupancy of their country by white people, a bounty being placed on their heads and the traffic in children for slaves being profitable and unrestrained. A few families of them are still living in the neighborhood of their former homes.

=== Wailaki ===
The Wailaki (Wintun term meaning "north language.") or in their own language Kinist'ee ("the people") lived in northwestern California, along the Eel River south of Kekawaka Creek and the North Fork Eel River in three main subdivisions: Tsennahkenne or Tsen-nah-ken-ne (Eel River Wailaki or Mainstem Eel River band); Bahneko or Bah-ne-ko keah (North Fork [Eel River] Wailaki or North Fork Eel River band); and Che-teg-gah-ahng (Pitch Wailaki or Pitch band) (located farther up the North Fork of the Eel River). These regional groupings were divided into several bands and contained almost 100 villages:

Tsennahkenne, Tsen-nah-ken-ne or Eel River Wailaki (both sides Eel River from Boulder Creek to Cottonwood Creek, then West side south to Yuki border (around Blue Rock Creek))

- Bis-kaiyaah ("slide/riverbank - band") or Ch'inisnoo'-kaiyaah ("Indian Creek - band"); band on eastern side Eel River from Cottonwood Creek north to Willow Creek

- Villages
  - Daabisch'i'aandin (ant-something's den-place); "ants nest place"
  - Daabistciis'aandin (ant-red-lies-place)
  - Dilkitts'oo'kaaliindin (??-milk-flows up-place)
  - Kotc'ildjildin (he slips down-place); "man slipped down"
  - Sait'ohdaadin (sand-?-mouth-place); village near Sait'oo cliff
  - Sait'ooyeeh (sand-?-under); winter shelter under Sait'oo cliff
  - Seedibiintcekinee'din (stone-sharp-DIM-base-place); "rock sharp (?) under place"

- Daadii'schow-kaiyaah ("grasshopper-big - band") or Daadii'sdin-kaiyaah ("grasshopper-place - band"); band on western side Eel River from opposite mouth of North Fork Eel north to Natoikot Creek

- Villages
  - Baahntceekii (warrior-cry); "war (ghosts) cry"
  - Daadii'schowdin (grasshopper-AUG-place)
  - Lhtciishseeyeehbii' (ashes-stone-under-in it); "ashes rock shelter in"

- Kaikiitce-kaiyaah ("live oak - band") or Shaahnaa'ndoon'-kaiyaah ("Chamise Creek - band"); band on western side Eel River from Pine Creek at Horseshoe Bend north to Chamise Creek

- Villages
  - Daakostaatcedin
  - Dindaidin (flint-place); "flint place"
  - Naadilyaasdin (pine-young-place); "pine seeds place"

- Nin'keniitc-kaiyaah ("earth-middle - band") or Nee'taash-kaiyaah ("landslide - band"); band on western side Eel River from opposite mouth of North Fork Eel River extending about a mile south of there (north of McDonald Creek

- Villages
  - Bischowdaadin (stream bank-AUG-mouth-place); "slide large mouth place"
  - Nin'keniitcit (earth-the middle)

- Seetaah-kaiyaah or Seetaahbii'-kaiyaah ("stone-among(-in it) - band"); band on western side Eel River from Natoikot north to Pine Creek

- Villages
  - Ch'ibeetcekii' (pick grass-DIM-tail); "gather grass tail"
  - Ch'idee'kinee'din (something's horn-base-place); = Seetaahbii' ?
  - Ch'inaa'ghaan'tc'eedai' (something's eye-?asleep?-door?); "eye closed door"
  - Ilhgaichowkii' (??white?-AUG-tail)
  - Laashee'lhgottcedin (buckeye-pierced-DIM-place); "buckeye small hole place"
  - Sait'ootcedaadin (sand-?-DIM-tip-place); "sand point on"
  - Seedik'aandin (rock-ridge-place); "rock ridge place"
  - Seenaaghaatcedin (rock-wander-DIM-place); "stones walk around place"

- Seeyaadin-kaiyaah or Slaa-kaiyaah ("plural things/rope lies? - band"); band on eastern side Eel River from Willow Creek north to Copper Mine Creek

- Villages
  - Ch'oolhittcebinin' (graveyard-DIM-its hillside); "graveyard hillside"
  - Kaaslinchowdin (spring-AUG-place); "spring large place"
  - K'ai'tc'il'iintaahdin (Christmas berries-among-place); "Christmas berries among place"
  - Naataalliinkii' (step over-flow-tail); "step over creek tail"
  - T'ighiskotin (cottonwood-trail down); "cottonwood trail down"
  - T'ohch'ilishchowkii' ? (grass-?-AUG-tail); "grass sour large tail"
  - Toommischowdaa'din (water-slide-AUG-tip-place); "water slide large point place"
  - Tootcedin (water?, grass?-DIM-place)

- Tciiskot-kaiyaah ("ochre-creek - band") or Toos'aan-kaiyaah ("water-lies - band", "water stands people"); band on eastern side Eel River from Copper Mine Creek north to Boulder Creek

- Villages
  - K'ishs'aandin (alder tree-lies-place); "alder stands place"
  - Seechowkinee'din (rock-large-base-place); "rock large its base place"
  - tcadEtokInnEdAN (??-??-base-place)

Bahneko, Bah-ne-ko keah or North Fork [Eel River] Wailaki (both sides North Fork Eel from its mouth to about a mile up from Asbill Creek; East side Eel River between Cottonwood Creek and Yuki border (around Blue Rock Creek))

- Kaiyeeh-kiiyaahaan "(??-under - band"); band on north and south side North Fork Eel River, from Seechow-kiiyaahaan boundary west of Wilson Creek eastward to boundary with Pitch Wailaki

- Villages
  - Nooleehchowtaahdin (waterfall-AUG-among-place); "waterfalls large among"
  - Seeghaakindin (rocks-it floats through-place); "rocks through it (water) goes"

- Nee'lhtciichow-kaiyaah ("ground-red-AUG - band") or Seeghaa'-kaiyaah ("moss (rock-hair) - band"), Shaahnaa'ntcin'chii'-kaiyaah ("stream-dirty-tail - band"); band on eastern side Eel River from McDonald Creek north to mouth of North Fork Eel River

- Villages
  - K'ai'lhtciitaahdin (redbud-among-place); "redbud place"
  - Tseegholkiliinseeyeeh ? (rock-?-?-rock-under)

- Seechow-kiiyaahaan ("stone-AUG - band"); band on north and south side North Fork Eel River, next group after the Seetaandoon'-kaiyaah, extending for about one mile to a little downstream from Wilson Creek

- Villages
  - Seelhtciidaadin (rock-red-mouth-place); "stone red mouth place"
  - Tootak'it (water-between); "between water", a summer camp

- Seelhgaichow-kaiyaah ("stone-white-AUG - band", "rock white large people"), band on eastern side Eel River from McDonald Creek south to border with Yuki at Big Bend Creek

- Villages
  - Seelhgaichowdin (rock-white-AUG-place); "rock white large..."

- Seelhtciichow-kaiyaah ("stone-red-AUG - band", "rock red large people"), band on eastern side Eel River from mouth of North Fork Eel River north to Cottonwood Creek

- Villages
  - chug/-ge/-tah (Merriam)
  - K'ai'lhtciitaahdin (redbud-among-place); "redbud place"
  - Seetaatciikaiyaa (stone-??-DIM-tribe?)

- Seetaandoon'-kaiyaah or Seetaandoon'chii'-kaiyaah ("stone-goes straight into water(-tail) - band"); band on north side North Fork Eel River from its mouth on Eel River extending about 1/2 mile upstream

- Villages
  - Seenchiiyeeh; "rock large under"
  - Seetaandoon'chii' (rock-goes straight into water-tail); "rock runs to the water"

Che-teg-gah-ahng or Pitch Wailaki (North Fork Eel from a mile up from Asbill Creek all the way up to Lassik border (at Salt Creek); includes Hull's Creek and Casoose Creek)

- Ch'i'aankot-kiiyaahaan ("something's den/cave-creek - band"); band on Hull's Creek and Casoose Creek

- Villages
  - Ch'i'aanmiiyeeh (something's den/cave-under it)
  - Ch'ilkoochowdin (??-AUG-place)
  - Ch'ilkoochowkinee'din (??-AUG-base-place)
  - K'aishkonteelhdin (?-valley-place)
  - Loonbistee'din ?
  - Min'k'itdin (pond-place)
  - Seetciitciikidaadin ?
  - T'aan'chowsiidin (leaf-AUG-head?-place)
  - T'aan'tciighittcin ?

- Chowkot-kiiyaahaan ("AUG?-creek - band"); band on North Fork Eel from south of Red Mountain Creek to border with Lassik at Salt Creek

- Villages (no village names given)

- T'ohchaah-kiiyaahaan ("grass/prairie-big - band", "prairie large people"), band on both sides of North Fork Eel River from Hull's Creek north to about a mile south of Red Mountain Creek

- Villages
  - K'ishkonteelhdin (alder-valley-place); "alder flat"
  - Naandoon'din (it is straight?-place)
  - Seelhtcinninyeeh (rock-black?-face?-under)
  - Sin'aanyeeh ?
  - T'aantcintaanteelhdin (pepperwood-flat-place); "pepperwood flat"

- T'ohdinin'-kiiyaahaan ("grass/prairie-slope - band", "prairie slope people"), band on both sides of North Fork Eel River from Hull's Creek southwest to border with North Fork Wailaki

- Villages
  - Nee'lhghiindin (ground-greasy-place)
  - T'antcaanchowdin ?
  - T'ohchaahdin (grass/prairie-big-place)
  - Aantcinyaashbinin' (pepperwood-small-its hillside)
  - Seetcimmii' (stone-kind-in it)
  - Laawaasoonk'ait ?

Northern Bands (Kekawaka and allies, neither Wailaki nor Lassik; language like Wailaki, not Lassik) (both sides Eel River north of Boulder Creek on east side and Chamise Creek on west; north to Lassik border (around Kekawaka Creek))

- Daa'lhsow-kaiyaah ("surface-blue - band", "blue ground people"), band on western side Eel River north of Chamise Creek, to Lassik border? Possibly not Eel Wailaki or Lassik, but separate people
- Ilhkoodin-kaiyaah ("??? - band") or Yoiyidee'-kaiyaah ("far north - band"); band on eastern side Eel River from Boulder Creek north to Lassik Border? Possibly neither Eel Wailaki or Lassik, but a separate people
- K'aa'snaikot-kaiyaah ("arrow-??-creek - band") or Kekawaka band ("The people on the north side of Kekawaka creek and on the east side of Eel river were known to the Wailaki as kasnaikotkaiya, arrow creek people. North of them were the Lassik. These people joined with the whites in the extermination of the Wailaki. That they ever had any political bond with the Wailaki is improbable. They were related by marriage, however, with the iLkodANkaiya, to whose country they came for acorns and buckeyes when their own harvest was short." (Goddard, Hab.Wail.p. 108))
- K'in'din-kaiyaah ("bow-place - band", "bow people"), band on Jewett Creek (called by the Wailaki Dask'ekot - "lung creek") north to Lassik Border on Eel River

- Villages (no village names given)

- Seetaalhtciichow-kaiyaah ("pestle-red-AUG - band", "pestle red large people"), band north of Daa'lhsow-kaiyaah, at or near Jewett rock, close to Harris, California

=== Sinkyone (Sinkine) ===
The Sinkyone, with about 70 villages, had the land along the Eel River and South Fork Eel River, and a portion of coastline from Spanish Flat south.

== Ethnobotany ==
The Wailaki weave the roots and leaves of Carex into baskets and use the leaves to weave mats.

== Population ==
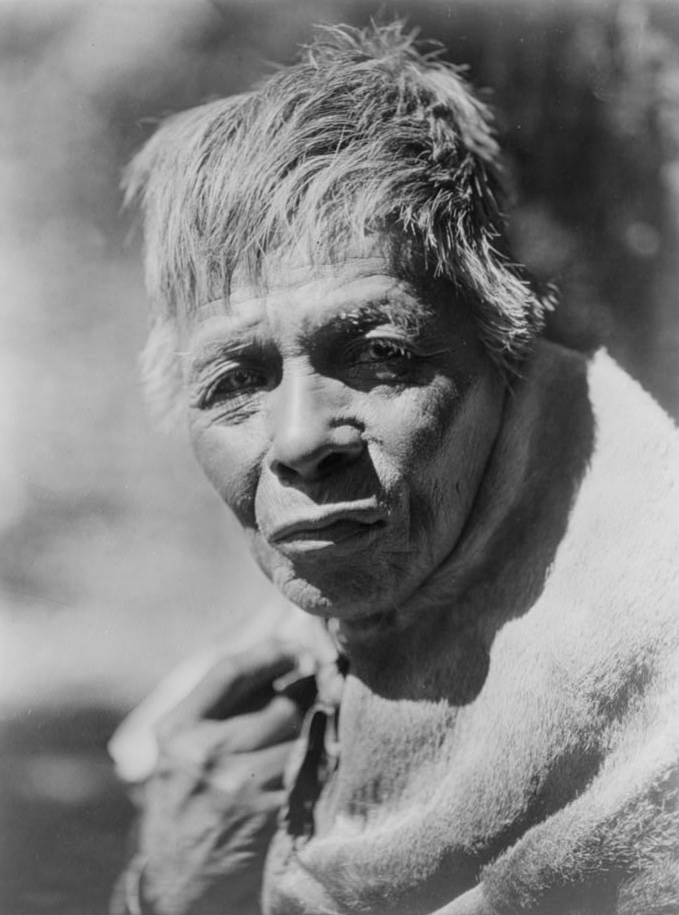
A Wailaki man by Edward S. Curtis, c. 1924

Estimates for the precontact populations of most Native groups in what is now known as California have varied substantially. (See Population of Native California.) Alfred L. Kroeber (1925:883) proposed a 1770 population for the Nongatl, Sinkyone, and Lassik as 2,000, and the population of the Wailaki as 1,000. Sherburne F. Cook (1976) suggested a total of 4,700 for the Nongatl, Sinkyone, Lassik, Wailaki, Mattole, and Kato. Martin A. Baumhoff (1958) estimated the aboriginal populations as 2,325 for the Nongatl, 4,221 for the Sinkyone, 1,411 for the Lassik, and 2,760 for the Wailaki, or a total of 10,717 for the four Eel River Athapaskan groups.

Kroeber estimated the combined population of the Nongatl, Sinkyone, and Lassik in 1910 as 100, and the population of the Wailaki as 200.

Today, some Wailaki people are enrolled in the Scotts Valley Band of Pomo Indians of California, the Grindstone Indian Rancheria of Wintun-Wailaki Indians, and the Round Valley Indian Tribes of the Round Valley Reservation (formerly: Covelo Indian Community Yuki, Wailaki, Concow, Little Lake Pomo, Nomlacki, and Pit River peoples).

== See also ==
- Eel River Athapaskan traditional narratives
- Bald Hills War
- Alaskan Athabaskans
