= Wailaki language =

Athabaskan language of California

Wailaki
- Eel River
- Native to: United States
- Region: California
- Ethnicity: Eel River Athapaskans
- Extinct: 1940s
- Revival: 2010s
- Language family: Na-Dené: Athabaskan; Pacific Coast Athabaskan; California Athabaskan; Wailaki
- Dialects: Sinkyone; Wailaki; Nongatl; Lassik

Language codes
- ISO 639-3: wlk
- Glottolog: wail1244
- ELP: Eel River Athabaskan
- Wailaki and other California Athabaskan languages

- Eel River Athabaskan is classified as Extinct by the UNESCO Atlas of the World's Languages in Danger.

Wailaki, also known as Eel River, is an extinct and revitalizing Athabaskan language spoken by the people of the Round Valley Reservation of northern California, one of four languages belonging to the California Athabaskan cluster of the Pacific Coast Athabaskan languages. Dialect clusters reflect the four Wailaki-speaking peoples, the Sinkyone, Wailaki, Nongatl, and Lassik, of the Eel River confederation. While less documented than Hupa, it is considered to be close to it. It went dormant in the 1940s, but in modern times it is being revived.

== Phonology ==
The sounds in Wailaki:

=== Consonants ===
		Bilabial	Alveolar			Palatal	Velar		Glottal
		Bilabial	plain	sibilant	lateral	Palatal	plain	pal.	Glottal
Nasal		m (Note: Sounds /m, ts, w/ are rather rare.)	n				ŋ		
Plosive	plain	p	t	ts		tʃ	k	kʲ	ʔ
Plosive	aspirated		tʰ			tʃʰ	kʰ	kʲʰ	
Plosive	ejective		tʼ	tsʼ		tʃʼ	kʼ	kʲʼ	
Fricative				s	ɬ	ʃ	ɣ		h
Approximant					l	j	w		

=== Vowels ===
Vowels in Wailaki are /i e a o/, and with length as /iː eː aː oː/.

== Grammar ==
Wailaki is polysynthetic, meaning that a single word in it is expressed in English as a sentence.
