= Euchre Creek =

Euchre Creek may refer to:

- Euchre Creek (Kansas), a creek in Brown County, Kansas, United States
- Euchre Creek (Curry County, Oregon), United States
- Euchre Creek (Lincoln County, Oregon), United States
- The Euchre Creek band of the Rogue River Native Americans in Oregon
