= Eel River Athapaskan traditional narratives =

Eel River Athapaskan traditional narratives include myths, legends, tales, and oral histories.

== Who preserves them ==
- the Wailaki, Lassik, Nongatl, and Sinkyone peoples of the Eel River basin of northwestern California.

== Pattern of narratives ==
Eel River Athapaskan oral literature belongs primarily to the pattern of narratives that prevailed among the Pomo to the south and among the groups of central California in general.

=== Other important influences ===
- from northwestern California (the Hupa, Yurok, and Karuk) and from the wider Northwest Coast region of North America.

==== Secondary influences ====
More attenuated influences from the Plateau region have also been seen. (See also Traditional narratives (Native California)On-Line.)

== Sources ==
- Curtis, Edward S. 1907–1930. The North American Indian. 20 vols. Plimpton Press, Norwood, Massachusetts. (Seven Wailaki myths, including Theft of Fire, collected from North Fork John, vol. 14, pp. 167–169.)
- Essene, Frank. 1942. "Culture Element Distributions XXI: Round Valley". Anthropological Records 8:1-97. University of California Press, Berkeley. (Five Lassik narratives, including Theft of Fire, pp. 93–96.)
- Kroeber, A. L. 1925. Handbook of the Indians of California. Bureau of American Ethnology Bulletin No. 78. Washington, D.C. (Brief note on Sinkyone creation myth, p. 150.)
- Thompson, Stith. 1929. Tales of the North American Indians. Harvard University Press, Cambridge, Massachusetts.(Bear and Fawns narrative, pp. 153–154, from Goddard 1906.)

=== Specific groups ===
==== Athapan ====
(See Wailaki below)

==== Lassik ====
- Goddard, Pliny E. 1906. "Lassik Tales". Journal of American Folklore 19:133-140. (Nine narratives collected in 1903, including Theft of Fire and Bear and Fawns.)

==== Sinkyone ====
- Kroeber, A. L. 1919. "Sinkyone Tales". Journal of American Folklore 32:346-351. (Narratives from George Burt and Mrs. Tom Bell, including Theft of Fire and Bear and Fawns, with comparative notes.)

===== Additional notes =====
- Nomland, Gladys Ayer. 1935. "Sinkyone Notes". University of California Publications in American Archaeology and Ethnology 36:149-178. Berkeley. (Myths collected in 1928–1929, pp. 170–174.)

==== Wailaki (Athapakan ) ====
- Goddard, Pliny E. 1921–1923. "Wailaki Texts". International Journal of American Linguistics 2:77-135. (36 myths, including Theft of Fire.)
- Seaburg, William R. 1977. "The Man Who Married a Grizzly Girl (Wailaki)". In Northern Californian Texts, edited by Victor Golla and Shirley Silver, pp. 114–120. International Journal of American Linguistics Native American Texts Series No. 2(2). University of Chicago Press.

===== Additional notes =====
- Seaburg, William R. 1977. "A Wailaki (Athapaskan) Text with Comparative Notes". International Journal of American Linguistics 43:327-332. (A short myth collected from John Tip by Fang-Kuei Li in 1927.)

==== Western Kuksu ====
- Loeb, Edwin M. 1932. "The Western Kuksu Cult". University of California Publications in American Archaeology and Ethnology 33:1-137. Berkeley. (Note on Wailaki mythology, pp. 73–75.)
