= Kwalhioqua–Clatskanie language =

Extinct Athabascan language

Kwalhioqua–Clatskanie
- Kwalhioqua–Tlatskanai
- Native to: United States
- Region: Washington
- Ethnicity: Kwalhioqua–Clatskanie people
- Extinct: c. 1910
- Language family: Na-Dené: Athabaskan–Eyak; Athabaskan; Northern; Kwalhioqua–Clatskanie
- Dialects: Kwalhioqua; Clatskanie

Language codes
- ISO 639-3: qwt
- Glottolog: kwal1258

Kwalhioqua–Clatskanie (Kwalhioqua–Tlatskanai, Lower Columbia Athabaskan) is an extinct Athabaskan language of northwest Oregon and southwest Washington state, along the lower Columbia River. It was documented in the early 20th century, and a wordlist was compiled, consisting of some 322 words.

== Dialects ==
Dialects were:

- Kwalhioqua (a.k.a. Willapa or Willoopah) (north of the lower Columbia River)
  - Willapa or Wela'pakote'li subdialect
  - Suwal subdialect
- Clatskanie (a.k.a. Tlatskanai) (south of the lower Columbia River)

== Linguistic features ==
Kwalhioqua-Clatskanie was likely most closely related to Tsilhqotʼin or Babine-Witsuwitʼen, the latter of which is unique, along with Kwalhioqua-Clatskanie, in having a certain sound change from Proto-Athabaskan. Other sound changes into Kwalhioqua-Clatskanie are unique in the family, and have helped Michael E. Krauss reconstruct forms for the Proto-Athabaskan fricative series.

Kwalhioqua-Clatskanie had an optional distributive plural according to David Beck. It had a decimal number system, a feature it shared with Athabaskan languages of southern Alaska, Oregon, and California. Numerals for both dialects (Kwalhioqua and Clatskanie) were collected by Horatio Hale in 1840.
