= Lake Earl =

Lagoon in the state of California, United States

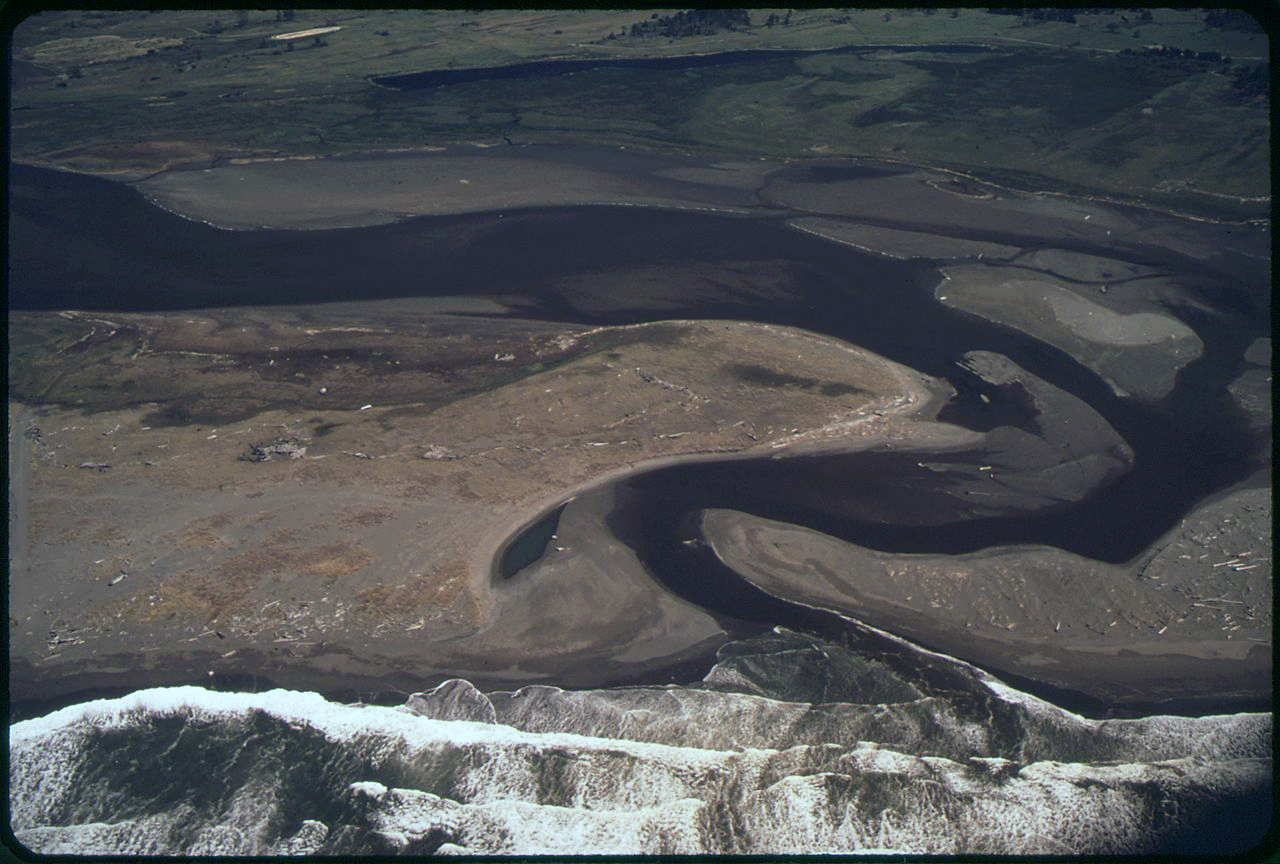
- Lake Earl from the Air

- Location within California
- Coordinates: 41.825669°N 124.188693°W
- Type: fresh water to saline lagoon
- Primary outflows: Pacific Ocean
- Basin countries: United States
- Surface area: 6,900 acres (28 km^{2})
- Surface elevation: 14 m (46 ft)

Lake Earl is a lagoon on the extreme northern California coast, just south of the Oregon border. A navigable body of water, it lies partly within Tolowa Dunes State Park and partly within Lake Earl Wildlife Area in Del Norte County, California and the third-most important seabird area on the West Coast after the Farallons and the Channel Islands.

Lake Earl has two principal lobes separated by "the Narrows." The smaller lobe, which is also closer to the ocean and the sand bar breach site, is called Lake Tolowa or Lake Talawa by the California Department of Fish and Game. The larger lobe of the lagoon is Lake Earl. Lake Earl is mostly freshwater while Lake Tolowa has a higher salt content. As opposed to an estuary, which is typically open to the ocean and fresh water constantly, a lagoon seals up seasonally and fills with a predominance of fresh water. The lagoon, located on the coast of California about 11 miles (18 km) south of the border with Oregon, is manually breached when the water levels rise to 8 feet (2.4 m) to 10 feet (3.0 m) mean sea level (MSL). Though references to levels on USGS charts are made relative to Mean Lower Low Water (MLLW) leading to difficulty over the management of the lake's levels. If allowed to breach naturally, the water surface would rise to 12 feet (3.7 m) to 14 feet (4.3 m). At 10 feet (3.0 m) MSL there is approximately 4,900 acres (20 km^{2}) of water surface in the lagoons and 4,950 acres (20.0 km^{2}) of wetlands; at 8 feet (2.4 m) MSL, the surface waters area is approximately 4,200 acres (17 km^{2}). At 2 feet (0.61 m) MSL, the combined surface area is a mere 2,191 acres (8.87 km^{2}) of open water surrounded by 2,000 acres (8.1 km^{2}) of wetlands.

Lake Earl is the largest coastal lagoon in California. Due to the remoteness and natural environment of the area, the lake is often used for birders and is locally popular with duck hunters. Fishing for cutthroat trout is also a common use. The lake is lightly used by kayakers. Water skiing is prohibited.

== Endangered Species Act ==
The lagoon is home to numerous California state- and/or federally listed threatened or endangered species. To permit the breaching, the U.S. Army Corps of Engineers consulted with United States Fish and Wildlife Service to determine the effects of water movement on several species. Species affected included the California brown pelican, Western snowy plover, bald eagle, Oregon silverspot butterfly, and tidewater goby. The Corps formally determined that the project would have no effect on the western lily. Coho salmon have not been observed in the lagoon since 1989, seven years after the Department of Fish and Game stopped planting them.

== History ==
There is a native legend or metaphor of the Great Snake that abides in the lagoon and escapes to the ocean periodically. It goes when the Snake wants.

The name derives from rrł, a Yurok place name, rather than from someone named Earl.

The Achulet Massacre took place at a Tolowa village near Lake Earl in 1854 as did feuds between cattlemen and loggers, and eventually between government and private property advocates.

Lake Earl is a significant component in the Flood Control Plan for the County of Del Norte. The breaching of the lake's sandbar is vital to the functioning of sewers and wells, and for the management of runoff from storms and seasonal rains.

The California legislature directed and provided funding to the California Department of Fish and Game to begin purchasing properties for the Lake Earl Wildlife Area under the Keen-Nejedly Act of 1975. The Department of Fish and Game owns most of the area directly affected by the rising waters of Lake Earl in the Lake Earl Wildlife Area and the Tolowa Dunes State Park. Other properties are owned by various non-profit organizations and private citizens. The Department of Fish and Game plans to purchase the remaining properties at fair market value, though some landowners feel that Fish and Game is managing the lagoon to flood their land and drive the price down.
