= Loren Bommelyn =

Tolowa traditionalist, language instructor, and basket weaver from California

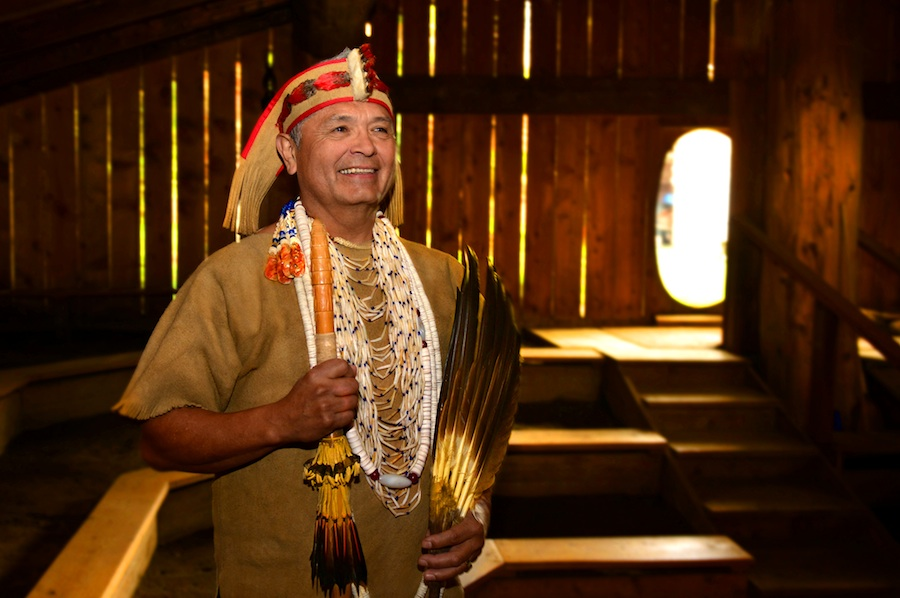
- Bommelyn in 2014
- Born: 1956 (age 69–70)
- Education: Master's Degree in Linguistics, University of Oregon, family
- Known for: Basket weaving, singing
- Elected: Councilor Emeritus, Tolowa Dee-niʼ Nation

Loren Meʼ-lash-ne Bommelyn (born 1956) is a tradition bearer for the Tolowa tribe. He has dedicated himself to preserving the traditional songs, language, and basketry. He is the foremost ceremonial leader of the tribe, and its most prolific basketweaver. Bommelyn is an enrolled member of the federally recognized Tolowa Dee-niʼ Nation and was elected as their tribal chairperson.

== Work in linguistics and education ==
Loren Bommelyn is Tolowa, Karuk, and Wintu. His mother, Eunice Bommelyn, was a prominent tribal genealogist, Tolowa language proponent and cultural advocate. He is a fluent speaker of the Tolowa language and taught for many years at Del Norte High School in Crescent City, California. He earned his master's degree in linguistics from the University of Oregon. After years of studying with Tolowa elders, Bommelyn has published educational material about the Tolowa language. He played a role in convincing the University of California system to accept Native American languages as part of its entrance requirements for world language. He has advocated the use of the Tolowa language in modern technology, including Facebook and texting.

Before retirement, Bommelyn taught at Taa-ʼat-dvn Indian Magnet Charter School in Crescent City with his wife Lena Bommelyn, who has also retired. Of his work at Taa-ʼat-dvn, Loren says, "It's important for students to know they can move about freely in American society and that they can be open and successful. We try to provide them opportunities for expansion and exploration."

As of 2012, Bommelyn's son, Pyuwa Bommelyn, is studying linguistics at the University of Oregon to continue Tolowa language preservation efforts.

== Basketry ==
While women make most baskets among Northern California tribes, men traditionally weave open-work baskets with entire plant shoots. This requires both extreme physical strength and dexterity. Bommelyn specializes in these open-work, utilitarian baskets, especially those made with hazel shoots. He wove his first basket at the age of 12. Today he is known particularly for his work baskets and baby cradles.

"There's a fancy part of the basket and a realistic part. You want to strive for perfection, but at the same time you want to make it for a function... I want my baskets to be used. The old Indians say that things like to be used, that when they aren't used they get lonesome."

== Awards ==
Bommelyn is a recipient of a 2002 National Heritage Fellowship awarded by the National Endowment for the Arts, which is the United States' highest honor in the folk and traditional arts. He was recognized for his work in preserving, practicing and promoting of Tolowa cultural traditions "including its language, native regalia, ceremonial dances and songs, and basketmaking.... He is today the single most knowledgeable individual of the indigenous language."

== Published works ==
- Bommelyn, Loren. Now You're Speaking Tolowa. Arcata, California: Center for Indian Community Development, Humboldt State University, 1995. ASIN B0006QF9EA.
- Givón, T. and Loren Bommelyn. "The Evolution of De-Transitive Voice in Tolowa Athabaskan." Studies in Language. 24:1, 2000: 41–76.

== See also ==
- List of Native American artists
- Visual arts by indigenous peoples of the Americas
