= Galice language =

Extinct Athabaskan language of America

Galice
- Upper Rogue River; Galice-Applegate
- Native to: United States
- Region: Oregon
- Extinct: 1963, with the death of Hoxie Simmons
- Language family: Na-Dené: Athabaskan; Pacific Coast Athabaskan; Oregon Athabaskan; Galice
- Dialects: Galice Creek; Applegate

Language codes
- ISO 639-3: gce
- Glottolog: gali1261

Galice /ɡəˈliːs/, or Galice-Applegate or Upper Rogue River, is an extinct Athabaskan language once spoken by the two Upper Rogue River Athabaskan tribes, the Galice and Applegate tribes of southwestern Oregon.

The language was spoken on the "Galice Creek and Applegate River, tributaries of the Rogue River in southwestern Oregon. There were at least two distinct dialects the Galice Creek and Applegate, but only the Galice Creek dialect is well documented." It is one of the languages of the Oregon Athabaskan (Tolowa–Galice) cluster of the Pacific Coast Athabaskan languages.

The Galice people are also called the Taltushtuntede, Tal-tvsh-dan-ni, and Galice Creek people. The Applegate people are also called the Nabiltse and Dakubetede.

== Phonology ==
Consonants
		Labial	Alveolar			Palato-alv./ Palatal	Velar		Glottal
		Labial	plain	sibilant	lateral	Palato-alv./ Palatal	plain	labial	Glottal
Nasal		m	n						
Plosives	voiceless	p	t	t͡s		t͡ʃ	k	kʷ	ʔ
Plosives	aspirated		tʰ			t͡ʃʰ	kʰ	kʷʰ	
Plosives	ejective		tʼ	t͡sʼ	t͡ɬʼ	t͡ʃʼ	kʼ	kʷʼ	
Fricative	voiceless			s	ɬ	ʃ		ʍ	h
Fricative	voiced			z	l	j		w	

The vowel sounds are /i/ [ɪ, i], /e/ [ɛ], /a/, and /o/. These vowels can appear in clusters and can also be elongated.

Galice also has several rules regarding the placements of consonants. For example, affricates can never end a stem, and neither can /z/, /m/, or /j/. On the other hand, some consonant clusters are found only at the end of a stem, for example /mʔ/, /ʔʃ/ and /ʔɬ/.

== Morphology ==
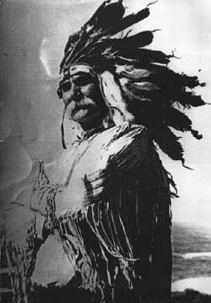
Hoxie Simmons (Confederated Siletz, 1872–1963), the last fluent speaker of Galice

Morphemes in Galice can be placed in one of four categories: stems, prefixes, postpositions and enclitics. Prefixes can be either derivational or grammatical, where the derivational helps make up a word base and is nearly always in the shape of CV. Grammatical prefixes are less common but have more flexibility in their shape

Galice has three major word classes: nouns, verbs, and articles. Nouns can only be inflected for the possessive, in which case a prefix is added. Verbs may be inflected for person and number for neuter verbs and additionally for aspect in active and passive verbs. Nouns can come in four different types: a simple noun, which is a single stem morpheme; complex nouns, which has an apparent sequence; nominalized verbs; and compounds, which contain two (and sometimes three) noun bases in any of the other three categories.

Verbs in Galice are made up of a stem preceded by one or more grammatical prefixes and zero or more derivational prefixes. There are 10 positions in a verb form and each can only be filled by specific types of prefixes and may not be filled at all.

Position Number	Prefix
Position 1	Pronoun (may remain empty and cannot occur without Position 2)
Position 2	Postposition (may remain empty and cannot occur without Position 1)
Position 3	Derivational Prefix (may remain empty)
Position 4	Third person plural
Position 5	Pronominal (in the case of intransitive verb), Object pronoun (with intransivitves)
Position 6	Derivational Prefix (may remain empty)
Position 7	Aspectival prefixes (when empty, verb is in the zero-imperfective)
Position 8	Subject pronoun (other than that in Position 5; when empty verb form is in third person)
Position 9	Classifiers (verbs without this prefix are in zero-class)
Position 10	Stem allomorph

=== Number and person ===
==== Number ====
Number is not ordinarily marked in the noun. Those that are tend to be kinship terms and are marked with the enclitics –yoo or –kee.

==== Person ====
Galice has 1st, 2nd, 3rd person. 1st and 2nd person singular and plural are marked in position 8. 3rd person remains unmarked in the singular, but in the plural form, it is marked in position 4 by haa- or ¬hii-. 1st person singular is marked by š- in all occurrences. 1st person plural can be marked with id- or i- depending in the class of the verb. Nasalization occurs in position eight when denoting 2nd person singular, while2nd person plural can be marked with oʔo-, ʔa-,ʔe-, or ʔo- depending on the preceding prefix.

=== Classificatory verbs ===
Galice has a relatively tame number of classificatory prefixes for its verb stems. It comes in with a modest 7 classes. In Galice, the class prefix comes just before the verb stem, in position nine.

Class Number	Meaning
I	A single round object
II	A long slender object
III	A living being (humans or animals)
IV	A container with contents
V	A fabric like object
VI	Several objects, a mass, several people or a rope-like object
VII	A package-like object
