= Tututni language =

Native American language spoken in Oregon

Tututni
- Tutudin, Coquille, (Lower) Rogue River
- Dotodəni
- Native to: Oregon
- Ethnicity: Coquille, Tututni, Chasta Costa
- Extinct: 1983; 3 (2006)
- Revival: 12 (2006)
- Language family: Na-Dené: Athabaskan; Pacific Coast Athabaskan; Oregon Athabaskan; Tututni
- Dialects: Coquille; Tututni; Euchre Creek; Chasta Costa; Mikwanutni; Sixes; Pistol River

Language codes
- ISO 639-3: Either: tuu – Tututni coq – Coquille
- Glottolog: tutu1242 Tututni coqu1236 Coquille
- Tututni is classified as Extinct by the UNESCO Atlas of the World's Languages in Danger.

Tututni (Dotodəni; alternatively Tutudin), also known as Upper Coquille, (Lower) Rogue River and Nuu-wee-ya, is an Athabaskan language spoken by three Lower Rogue River Athabaskan tribes: the Tututni tribe (including the Euchre Creek band), the Coquille tribe, and the Chasta Costa tribe, who are part of the Rogue River Indians of southwestern Oregon. In 2006 students at Linfield College participated in a project to "revitalize the language". It is one of the four languages belonging to the Oregon Athabaskan cluster of the Pacific Coast Athabaskan languages.

Dialects were Coquille (Upper Coquille, Mishikhwutmetunee), spoken along the upper Coquille River; Tututni (Tututunne, Naltunnetunne, Mikonotunne, Kwatami, Chemetunne, Chetleshin, Khwaishtunnetunnne); Euchre Creek, and Chasta Costa (Illinois River, Šista Qʼʷə́sta).

== Phonology ==
The following lists the consonant and vowel sounds in the Tututni language:

Consonants
		Bilabial	Alveolar			Retroflex	Palatal	Velar		Glottal
		Bilabial	plain	lat.	sib.	Retroflex	Palatal	plain	lab.	Glottal
Plosive/ Affricate	plain	p	t				tʃ	k	kʷ	ʔ
Plosive/ Affricate	aspirated		tʰ				tʃʰ			
Plosive/ Affricate	ejective		tʼ	tɬʼ	tsʼ	tʂʼ	tʃʼ	kʼ	kʷʼ	
Fricative				ɬ	s	ʂ	ʃ	x	xʷ	h
Sonorant		m	n	l			j	ɣ	ɣʷ	

Vowels
	Front	Central	Back
Close	i		
Mid	e	ə	o
Open		a	
