= Tolowa =

Athabaskan-speaking Native American group in the United States

Xvsh

Total population
- 910

Regions with significant populations
- United States ( California, Oregon)

Languages
- English, formerly Tolowa and Siletz Dee-ni

Religion
- Traditional tribal religion and mainstream Christianity, previously Indian Shaker religion

Related ethnic groups
- Chetco and Tututni

The Tolowa people (/ˈtɒləwə/), or Taa-laa-wa Dee-niʼ, are an Athabaskan nation of Native Americans. Two rancherías (Smith River and Elk Valley) still reside in their traditional territory in northwestern California. Those removed to the Siletz Reservation in Oregon are located there.

Related to current locations, Tolowa people are members of several federally recognized tribes: Tolowa Dee-niʼ Nation (Tolowa, Chetco, Yurok), Elk Valley Rancheria (Tolowa and Yurok), Confederated Tribes of Siletz (more than 27 native tribes and bands, speaking 10 distinct languages, including Athapascans speaking groups of SW Oregon, like Upper Umpqua, Coquille, Tututni, Chetco, Tolowa, Galice and Applegate River people), Trinidad Rancheria (Chetco, Hupa, Karuk, Tolowa, Wiyot, and Yurok), Big Lagoon Rancheria (Yurok and Tolowa), Blue Lake Rancheria (Wiyot, Yurok, and Tolowa) as well as the unrecognized Tolowa Nation.

== History ==
Their homeland, Taa-laa-waa-dvn ('Tolowa ancestral-land') lies along the Pacific Coast between the watersheds of Wilson Creek and Smith River (Tolowa: Xaa-wun-taa-ghii~-li, Xaa-wvnʼ-taa-ghii~-li~, or Nii~-li~) basin and vicinity in Del Norte in northwestern California. The area is bounded by the California–Oregon border to the north, and Wilson Creek, north of the Klamath River in California, to the south. They lived in approximately eight permanent villages on present-day Crescent City Harbor and Lake Earl (Ee-chuu-leʼ or Chʼuu-let, lit. 'large body of water'). The most important Tolowa village is Yontocket, California (Yanʼ-daa-kʼvt). Their tribal neighbors were the Chetco (Chit Dee-niʼ or Chit-dv-neʼ), Tututni (Tʼuu-duʼ-dee-niʼ) to the north; Shasta Costa (Shis-taa-kʼwvs-sta-dv-ne or See-staa-kʼwvt-sta Dee-niʼ), Takelma (Ghanʼ-tsʼii-ne), Galice Creek / Taltushtuntede (Talh-dash-dv-neʼ) to the northeast, all of which were removed to the Siletz Reservation, and Karuk (Chʼvm-ne Dee-niʼ or Chʼvm-ne Xee-sheʼ) to the east; and the Yurok (Dvtlh-mvsh or Dvtlh-mvsh Xee-sheʼ) to the south.

The name Tolowa is derived from Taa-laa-welh, an Algic name given to them by the Yurok (Klamath River People) (meaning 'people of Lake Earl'). The autonym is Hush, also spelled Xus or Xvsh, meaning 'person' or 'human being'.

The neighboring Karuk called them Yuhʼára, or Yurúkvaarar ('Indian from downriver') and used this Karuk name also for the Yurok, and the Tolowa territory Yuhʼaráriik or Yuhʼararih ('Place of the Downriver Indians'). Today the Karuk use also the term Imtípaheenshas, derived from Imtipahéeniik (lit. 'Tolowa Indian place'; i.e., Crescent City, California).

The Tolowa embraced the Ghost Dance religion from 1872 to 1882, in hopes of getting relief from European-American encroachment.

=== Genocide ===
In 1770, the Tolowa had a population of 1,000; their population soon dropped to 150 in 1910; this was almost entirely due to deliberate mass murder in what has been called genocide which has been recognized by the state of California. In a speech before representatives of Native American peoples in June 2019, California governor Gavin Newsom apologized for the genocide. Newsom said: "That's what it was, a genocide. No other way to describe it. And that's the way it needs to be described in the history books." Among these killings the Yontoket Massacre left 150 to 500 Tolowa people recorded dead. Because their homes had burned down, the place received the name "Burnt Ranch". The Yontoket massacre decimated the cultural center of the Tolowa peoples. The natives from the surrounding areas would gather there for their celebrations and discussions. The survivors of the massacre were forced to move to the village north of Smith's River called Howonquet. The slaughtering of the Tolowa people continued for some years. They were seemingly always caught at their Needash celebrations. These massacres caused some unrest which led in part to the Rogue River Indian war. Many Tolowa people were incarcerated at Battery Point in 1855 to withhold them from joining an uprising led by their chief. In 1860, after the Chetco/Rogue River War, 600 Tolowa were forcibly relocated to Indian reservations in Oregon, including what is now known as the Siletz Reservation in the Central Coastal Range. Later, some were moved to the Hoopa Valley Reservation in California. Adding to the number of dead from the Yontoket Massacre and the Battery Point Attack are many more in the following years. These massacres included the Chetko Massacre with 24 dead, the Smith creek massacre with 7 dead, the Howonquet Massacre with 70 dead, the Achulet massacre with 65 dead (not including those whose bodies were left in the lake) and the Stundossun Massacre with 300 dead. In total, 902 Tolowa Native Americans were killed in 7 years. There are no records that any of the perpetrators were ever held accountable. This means over 90% of the entire Tolowa population was killed in deliberate massacres.

== Language ==
The Tolowa have traditionally spoken Taa-laa-wa Dee-niʼ Wee-yaʼ, the Tolowa language, one of the Athabaskan languages.

At the Siletz Reservation in central Oregon, tribes speaking ten distinct languages were brought together in the mid-19th century. In the early 21st century, the remaining native language spoken is known as Siletz Dee-ni, related to Tolowa, although many of the original tribes spoke Salish languages.

In 2007, in coordination with the Living Tongues Institute for Endangered Languages, the Confederated Tribes of Siletz Indians produced a "talking dictionary" in this language to aid in preservation and teaching. Alfred "Bud" Lane, among the last fluent native speakers of Siletz Dee-ni on the reservation, has recorded 14,000 words of the language in this effort.

== Culture ==
The Tolowa organized their subsistence around the plentiful riverine and marine resources and acorns (san-chvn). Their society was not formally stratified, but considerable emphasis was put on personal wealth.

Tolowa villages were organized around a headman and usually consisted of related men, in a patrilineal kinship system, where inheritance and status passed through the male line. The men married women in neighboring tribes. The brides were usually related (sisters), in order for the wealth to remain in the paternal families.

The ocean and the river provided a significant food source for the Tolowa tribe. Additionally, the tribe captured lamprey eels from the river and collected large ocean mussels (shellfish) along the shoreline. Smelt, a small fish, were caught, dried on the beach, and preserved for future consumption. With their boats, the Tolowa tribe was able to venture into the ocean to hunt seals, sea lions, and sea otters on the offshore rocks. Whales that washed ashore were claimed by the nearest village. Acorns served as a vital food source for the Tolowa, supplemented by other nuts, berries, and seeds.

== Population ==
Estimates for the pre-contact populations of most Native groups in California have varied substantially. Various estimates for the 1770 population of Tolowa have ranged from as low as 450 to an upper end around 2,400.

In 1910, there were reportedly 150 Tolowa. The 1920 census listed 121 Tolowa left in Del Norte County, California. By 2009, there were approximately 1,000 Tolowa Indians.

== See also ==
- Tolowa language
- Tolowa traditional narratives
- Eunice Bommelyn, Tolowa historian, genealogist and language advocate
- Loren Bommelyn
