= Tolowa language =

Athabaskan language spoken in Oregon

Tolowa
- Taa-laa-wa Dee-niʼ Wee-yaʼ
- Pronunciation: [tʰaːlaːwa teːniʔ weːjaʔ]
- Native to: United States
- Region: southwest Oregon
- Ethnicity: 100 Chetco (1977); 1,000 Tolowa (2000)
- Extinct: 1990s
- Revival: L2 speakers since 1980s
- Language family: Na-Dené: Athabaskan; Pacific Coast Athabaskan; Tolowa

Language codes
- ISO 639-3: Either: tol – Tolowa ctc – Chetco
- Glottolog: tolo1259
- ELP: Tolowa

Tolowa (/ˈtɒləwə/; autonym: Taa-laa-wa Dee-niʼ Wee-yaʼ; also called Chetco-Tolowa or Siletz Dee-niʼ) is a member of the Pacific Coast subgroup of the Athabaskan language family. Together with three other closely related languages (Lower Rogue River Athabaskan, Upper Rogue River Athabaskan or Galice-Applegate and Upper Umpqua or Etnemitane) it forms a distinctive Oregon Athabaskan cluster within the subgroup.

== Geographic distribution ==
At the time of first European contact Tolowa was spoken in several large and prosperous village communities along the Del Norte County coast in the far northwestern corner of California and along the southern coast of adjacent Curry County, Oregon. Today the term Tolowa (or sometimes Smith River) is used primarily by those residing in California, most of whom are affiliated with the Tolowa Dee-niʼ Nation. Those residing in Oregon, most of whom are affiliated with the Confederated Tribes of Siletz southwest of Portland, where their ancestors were removed in the 1850s (Beckham 1971), refer to themselves as Chetco, Tututni, or Deeniʼ.

For details of the linguistic documentation of Chetco-Tolowa and a survey of Oregon Athabaskan phonology and grammar, see Golla (2011:70-75).

== Tolowa language revitalization ==
Loren Bommelyn, a fluent speaker and linguist, has published several pedagogical books and teaches young Tolowa students in Crescent City, California.

== Siletz Dee-niʼ ==
Siletz Dee-niʼ is a form of Tolowa historically spoken by members of the Confederated Tribes of Siletz Indians on the Siletz Indian Reservation in Oregon, "restricted to a small area on the central Oregon coast". According to a report by the National Geographic Society and the Living Tongues Institute for Endangered Languages, it is the last of many languages spoken on the reservation and was said in 2007 to have only one living speaker. However, the language has since been at least partially revived, and in some areas, "many now text each other in Siletz Dee-ni".

Courses for 6th- through 8th-graders have been offered at Oregon's Siletz Valley Charter School. Alfred "Bud" Lane has gathered 14,000 words of Siletz Dee-niʼ, in an online audio/picture dictionary for the use of the community.

== Phonology ==
As with many Athabaskan languages, Tolowa features contrasting aspirated, unaspirated, and ejective stops, as well as contrasting vowel length and nasality. Tolowa is not fully tonal, but instead has a pitch accent. This is typical of the Pacific Coast Athabaskan languages.

=== Consonants ===
		Bilabial	Alveolar			Palatal	Velar		Glottal
		Bilabial	plain	sibilant	retroflex	Palatal	plain	lab.	Glottal
Occlusive	unaspirated	p	t			tʃ	k	kʷ	ʔ
Occlusive	aspirated		tʰ			tʃʰ			
Occlusive	ejective		tʼ	tsʼ	ʈʂʼ	tʃʼ	kʼ	kʷʼ	
Continuant	voiceless		ɬ	s	ʂ	ʃ	x	xʷ	h
Continuant	voiced		l				ɣ		
Sonorant	plain	m	n			j		w	
Sonorant	glottalized	mˀ	nˀ			jˀ		wˀ	

/ɬ/ is affricated to [tɬ] after vowels. /j/ is realized as [j̃] after nasal vowels.

=== Vowels ===
		Front		Central		Back	
		short	long	short	long	short	long
Close	oral	i	iː			u	uː
Close	nasal	ĩ	ĩː			ũ	ũː
Close-mid		e	eː	ə			
Open	oral			a	aː		
Open	nasal			ã	ãː		

Tolowa vowels have some degree of allophonicity./u/ and /o/ are in free variation; [ɔ] is an allophone of /a/ after palatals and velars; /ə/ is raised to [ɨ] near palatals and to [ʉ] before velars, and is nasalized ([ə̃]) before nasal consonants. In addition, Tolowa has three diphthongs: [ai], [au], and [ui].

== Orthography ==
Three alphabets have been used since the formation of the Tolowa Dee-niʼ Language program, sponsored by the Del Norte Indian Welfare Association in 1969. The first was a Tolowa version of the Uni-fon alphabet. This was created by Tom Parsons at Humboldt State University; however, after he left the university, publication in the alphabet ceased.

Unifon Tolowa alphabet
X	B	C	Ↄ	D	E	Ɪ	G	H	J	K	L	M	N	O	P	R	S	T	U	W	Y

A new Practical Alphabet was devised in 1993 for purposes of typing on the computer.

1993 alphabet
Spelling	a	aa	ą	ąą	b	ch	chʼ	d	dr	e	ee	g	gh	gw	h	i	ii	į	įį	ɨ	kʼ	krʼ	l	ł	m	n	p	s	sh	sr	t	tʼ	trʼ	tsʼ	u	uu	ų	ųų	ʉ	w	x	xw	y	ʼ
Phoneme	a	aː	ã	ãː	p	tʃʰ	tʃʼ	t	tʃ	e	eː	k	ɣ	kʷ	h	i	iː	ĩ	ĩː	ɨ	kʼ	kʷʼ	l	ɬ	m	n	pʰ	s	ʃ	ʂ	tʰ	tʼ	ʈʂʼ	tsʼ	u	uː	ũ	ũː	ʉ	w	x	xʷ	j	ʔ

In 1997, Loren Bommelyn developed an alphabet which replaces the nasal hook with a tilde, both ɨ and ʉ with v, losing that unnecessary distinction, and ł with lh.

Syllables are usually separated with an en dash (-) for clarity.

1997 ASCII alphabet
Spelling	a	aa	a~	aa~	b	ch	ch'	d	dr	e	ee	g	gh	gw	h	i	ii	i~	ii~	k'	kr'	l	lh	m	n	p	s	sh	sr	t	t'	tr'	ts'	u	uu	u~	uu~	v	w	x	xw	y	'
Phoneme	a	aː	ã	ãː	p	tʃʰ	tʃʼ	t	tʃ	e	eː	k	ɣ	kʷ	h	i	iː	ĩ	ĩː	kʼ	kʷʼ	l	ɬ	m	n	pʰ	s	ʃ	ʂ	tʰ	tʼ	ʈʂʼ	tsʼ	u	uː	ũ	ũː	ə	w	x	xʷ	j	ʔ

== Bibliography ==
- Beckham, Stephen Dow (1971). Requiem for a People: The Rogue River Indians and the Frontiersmen. Norman: University of Oklahoma Press.
- Bommelyn, Loren (1995). Now You're Talking Tolowa. Arcata: Humboldt State University, Center for Indian Community Development.
- Collins, James (1998). Understanding Tolowa Histories: Western Hegemonies and Native American Responses. London: Routledge
- Golla, Victor (2011). California Indian Languages. Berkeley: University of California Press. ISBN 978-052-026667-4.
- Macnaughtan, Don. Oregon Athapaskan Languages: Bibliography of the Athapaskan Languages of Oregon.
