= Calhoun House =

Calhoun House may refer to the following houses on the United States National Register of Historic Places:

- Mr. James Kent Calhoun House, Glencoe, Illinois
- James D. Calhoun House, Lincoln, Nebraska
- George Calhoun House - see National Register of Historic Places listings in Josephine County, Oregon
- Fort Hill (Clemson University, South Carolina), also known as the John C. Calhoun House and Library, on the Clemson University campus in Pickens County, South Carolina, also a National Historic Landmark
