= National Register of Historic Places listings in Redwood National and State Parks =

This is a list of the National Register of Historic Places listings in Redwood National and State Parks.

This is intended to be a complete list of the properties and districts on the National Register of Historic Places in Redwood National and State Parks, California, United States. The locations of National Register properties and districts for which the latitude and longitude coordinates are included below, may be seen in a map.

There are eight properties and districts listed on the National Register in the parks.

This National Park Service list is complete through NPS recent listings posted June 20, 2025.

== Current listings ==
	Name on the Register	Image	Date listed	Location	City or town	Description
1	Bald Hills Archaeological District		July 9, 1982 (#82001723)	Address Restricted	Orick	c. 500 B.C. to 1000 A.D. Chilula cultural site
2	Endert's Beach Archeological Sites	Endert's Beach Archeological Sites	June 30, 1977 (#77000121)	Address Restricted	Crescent City	
3	Lyons Ranches Historic District		March 19, 2018 (#100002212)	Bald Hills Rd., Redwoods National Park; 41°08′53″N 123°53′36″W	Orick vicinity	
4	O'Men Village Site		June 30, 1977 (#77000120)	Address Restricted	Klamath	
5	Old Requa		December 16, 1974 (#74000509)	Address Restricted	Redwood National Park	
6	Prairie Creek Fish Hatchery	Prairie Creek Fish Hatchery	February 4, 2000 (#00000034)	Milepost 124.83 on US 101, north of Orick; 41°19′59″N 124°01′45″W	Orick	In use 1925 to 1949.
7	Radar Station B-71	Radar Station B-71	April 19, 1978 (#78000282)	W of Klamath; 41°31′20″N 124°04′45″W	Klamath	
8	Redwood Highway	Redwood Highway	December 17, 1979 (#79000253)	West of Klamath; 41°36′36″N 124°06′26″W	Klamath vicinity	This segment of U.S. 101 in Redwood National and State Parks was abandoned in the 1930s, around a decade after it was opened. Because of its early abandonment, it has preserved evidence of the road construction techniques of the 1920s without subsequent modification. It was part of the first state highway in Humboldt and Del Norte counties, which transformed transportation and the economy in the region.

== See also ==
- National Register of Historic Places listings in Del Norte County, California
- National Register of Historic Places listings in Humboldt County, California
- National Register of Historic Places listings in California
