= National Register of Historic Places listings in Del Norte County, California =

Location of Del Norte County in California

This is a list of the National Register of Historic Places listings in Del Norte County, California.

This is intended to be a complete list of the properties and districts on the National Register of Historic Places in Del Norte County, California, United States. Latitude and longitude coordinates are provided for many National Register properties and districts; these locations may be seen together in a Google map.

There are 14 properties and districts listed on the National Register in the county.

This National Park Service list is complete through NPS recent listings posted September 4, 2026.

== Current listings ==
	Name on the Register	Image	Date listed	Location	City or town	Description
1	BROTHER JONATHAN (Shipwreck Site)	BROTHER JONATHAN (Shipwreck Site)	May 21, 2002 (#02000535)	About 4.5 miles (7.2 km) west of Point St. George; 41°46′29″N 124°20′50″W	Crescent City	
2	Crescent City Lighthouse	Crescent City Lighthouse	September 15, 1983 (#83001177)	A St., Battery Point Island; 41°44′39″N 124°12′07″W	Crescent City	Also known as Battery Point Light
3	Endert's Beach Archeological Sites	Endert's Beach Archeological Sites	June 30, 1977 (#77000121)	Address Restricted	Crescent City	
4	Gasquet Ranger Station Historic District	Gasquet Ranger Station Historic District	March 26, 1998 (#98000262)	10600 CA 199; 41°50′43″N 123°57′51″W	Gasquet	
5	Mus-yeh-sait-neh Village and Cultural Landscape Property		October 25, 1993 (#93001109)	Address Restricted	Gasquet	
6	O'Men Village Site		June 30, 1977 (#77000120)	Address Restricted	Klamath	
7	Old Requa		December 16, 1974 (#74000509)	Address Restricted	Redwood National Park	
8	Osgood Ditch	Osgood Ditch	October 4, 2001 (#01001151)	Historic channel of Osgood Ditch; 41°57′59″N 123°37′56″W	Siskiyou National Forest	Extends into Josephine County, Oregon
9	Point St. George Site	Point St. George Site	May 17, 1976 (#76000481)	Address Restricted	Crescent City	
10	Radar Station B-71	Radar Station B-71	April 19, 1978 (#78000282)	W of Klamath; 41°31′20″N 124°04′45″W	Klamath	
11	Redwood Highway	Redwood Highway	December 17, 1979 (#79000253)	West of Klamath; 41°36′36″N 124°06′26″W	Klamath vicinity	This segment of U.S. 101 in Redwood National and State Parks was abandoned in the 1930s, around a decade after it was opened. Because of its early abandonment, it has preserved evidence of the road construction techniques of the 1920s without subsequent modification. It was part of the first state highway in Humboldt and Del Norte counties, which transformed transportation and the economy in the region.
12	St. George Reef Light Station	St. George Reef Light Station	December 9, 1993 (#93001373)	NW Seal Rock, approximately 6 nautical mi. off coast from Point St. George; 41°50′14″N 124°22′31″W	Crescent City	
13	Upper Ditch		October 4, 2001 (#01001149)	Historic channel of Logan/Esterly Upper Ditch; 42°01′10″N 123°38′06″W	Siskiyou National Forest	Extends into Josephine County, Oregon. This ditch, built in 1854 to supply water from the East Fork Illinois River to several hydraulic mines, quickly returned a large profit to its investors. The ditch supplied mines worked by its own owners, as well as providing water for sale to other nearby diggings. It continued in operation until 1942, when the last hydraulic mining operations in the upper Illinois Valley ceased.
14	Yontocket Historic District	Yontocket Historic District	December 18, 1973 (#73000400)	Address Restricted	Fort Dick	

== See also ==
- List of National Historic Landmarks in California
- National Register of Historic Places listings in California
- California Historical Landmarks in Del Norte County, California
