= Dennis M. Powers =

- Born: October 2, 1942 (age 84)
- Education: University of Colorado Boulder (BA); Sturm College of Law (JD); Harvard Business School (MBA)
- Occupation: Writer
- Writing career
- Genre: Non-fiction
- Website: www.dennispowersbooks.com

Dennis M. Powers (born October 2, 1942) is an American nonfiction writer with different published works. He earned degrees at the University of Colorado Boulder (B.A., 1964), the University of Denver Law School (Juris Doctor, 1967), and the Harvard Business School (M.B.A., 1969).

He first worked for large corporations in various financial fields, before moving later to Santa Barbara, California. While there, he eventually started up a business law practice (ten years) while forming and running different small businesses. During this time, he wrote poetry, newspaper and magazine articles, fiction, and nonfiction works. Dennis Powers later joined the faculty of the Southern Oregon University School of Business in Ashland, Oregon, where he taught for twelve years and became a Full Professor with different nonfiction books published. Retiring from teaching full-time as an Emeritus faculty member, he continued his writing of books, newspaper articles, and other works that included public radio.

== Published works ==
The Power of Attorney Real Estate Forms Series (software and hardcopy) and The Power of Attorney Business Forms Series (also software and hardcopy) were first published. Legal Street Smarts was next, followed by Beating the Tough Times, Legal Expense Defense, The Office Romance, and The Internet Legal Guide.

Dennis Powers's nonfiction book, The Office Romance, was his publisher’s lead book in 1998 and he was on a national book tour. This book was subsequently brought out in Chinese and German editions. While then teaching at Southern Oregon University, he wrote over fifty published Internet, academic, legal encyclopedia chapters, magazine, and newspaper articles in various areas.

Chronicling the 1964 tsunami from the Good Friday earthquake that raced down Alaska and the U.S. West Coast, his book The Raging Sea followed in trade and mass-market paperback. Treasure Ship was next: This work is about the loss of the S.S. Brother Jonathan, a paddlewheel steamship that sank off northern California in 1865 with millions of dollars of gold and was finally discovered 125 years later. Treasure Ship was later brought out in paperback. Next, Sentinel of the Seas came out; this book is about the construction and operation of the dangerous and most expensive lighthouse built, St. George Reef Lighthouse. He continued with Taking the Sea, a book about the old-time wreckers, or ship salvagers, during the nineteenth and twentieth centuries. In 2010, his book about life at sea during the nineteenth and early twentieth centuries—and through the story of a charismatic sea captain, Dynamite Johnny O'Brien—was published as Tales of the Seven Seas: The Escapades of Captain Dynamite Johnny O'Brien.

== Bibliography ==
- The Power of Attorney Real Estate Forms Series (software and hardcopy)
- The Power of Attorney Business Forms Series (software and hardcopy)
- Legal Street Smarts (New York: Plenum Press, 1994), ISBN 0-306-44760-6
- Legal Expense Defense (Oregon, Oasis Press, 1995), ISBN 1-55571-348-3
- Beating the Tough Times (New York: Plenum Press, 1995), ISBN 0-306-45082-8
- The Office Romance (New York: Amacom Press/American Management Association, 1998), ISBN 0-8144-0464-2
- The Internet Legal Guide (New York: John Wiley & Sons, 2001), ISBN 0-471-16423-2
- The Raging Sea (New York: Kensington/Citadel Press, 2005), ISBN 0-8065-2682-3
- Treasure Ship (New York: Kensington/Citadel Press, 2006), ISBN 0-8065-2747-1
- Sentinel of the Seas (New York: Kensington/Citadel Press, 2007), ISBN 0-8065-2842-7
- Taking the Sea (New York: Amacom Press, 2009), ISBN 978-0-8144-1353-1
- Tales of the Seven Seas (New York: Taylor Trade, 2010), ISBN 978-1-58979-447-4
