= Logan/Esterly Upper Ditch =

- Upper Ditch
- U.S. National Register of Historic Places
- Location within Oregon Location within the United States
- Location: South of Cave Junction, Oregon, in Josephine County, Oregon, and Del Norte County, California
- Nearest city: Cave Junction, Oregon
- Coordinates: 42°01′10″N 123°38′06″W
- Area: 104.305 acres (42.211 ha)
- Built: 1854
- MPS: Upper Illinois Valley, Oregon Mining Resources MPS
- NRHP reference No.: 01001149
- Added to NRHP: October 4, 2001

The Logan/Esterly Upper Ditch is an abandoned, artificial watercourse in the Illinois River Valley of northern California and southern Oregon, United States. Built in 1854 to supply water from the river's East Fork in California to several hydraulic mines in Oregon, it quickly returned a large profit to its investors. The ditch supplied mines worked by its own owners, as well as providing water for sale to other nearby diggings and incidentally powering at least one sawmill. Mines it served include the Waldo, Fry Gulch, and Cameron mines. It continued in operation until 1942, when the last hydraulic mining operations in the upper Illinois Valley ceased. Several wooden structures associated with the ditch, such as trestles and flumes, disappeared by the end of the 20th century, but the earthen components remained mostly intact.

The ditch was a total of 7.6 miles (12.2 km) long; 4.1 miles (6.6 km) of the ditch's remnants were added to the National Register of Historic Places in 2001.

== See also ==
- National Register of Historic Places listings in Josephine County, Oregon
- National Register of Historic Places listings in Del Norte County, California
- Osgood Ditch
