= B71 =

B71, B-71 or B 71 may refer to:

- Bundesstraße 71, a German road
- B71 Sandoy, a football team in the Faroe Islands
- Lockheed SR-71 Blackbird, an American airplane
- Sicilian Defense, Dragon Variation, according to the Encyclopaedia of Chess Openings
- West Bromwich, according to the list of postal districts in the United Kingdom
- HLA-B71, an HLA-B serotype
- Tupolev SB-2, soviet bomber in licence production in Czechoslovakia was called B-71
- Radar Station B-71, a US Army Air Force early warning station in World War II
