= William Logan (Indian agent) =

William Logan was an Indian agent for the United States Bureau of Indian Affairs from 1861 to 1865, and was appointed superintendent of The Dalles Mint. His death in the sinking of the Brother Jonathan in July 1865 was one reason that the mint was never completed.

On July 13, 1861, Logan was appointed a U.S. Indian agent under the Oregon Superintendent of Indian Affairs by the administration of President Abraham Lincoln. He was the U.S. agent representative in the 1864 treaty with the Klamath, Modoc, and Yahooskin band of Snake Indians that created the Warm Springs Indian Reservation. A find of gold on October 23, 1861, led to a gold rush centered on The Dalles, then known as "Dalles City." In 1864, the U.S. Congress agreed to establish a branch of the United States Mint in The Dalles to manage the flow of gold and help fund the ongoing American Civil War. In 1865, having established his reputation as an Indian agent, Logan was appointed the superintendent of the U.S. branch mint at The Dalles. He and his family were in San Francisco in 1865, and boarded the Brother Jonathan on July 28 to return to Oregon. Both William and his wife perished when the ship ran aground and sank on July 30.
