= The Dalles Mint =

Building in Oregon, US

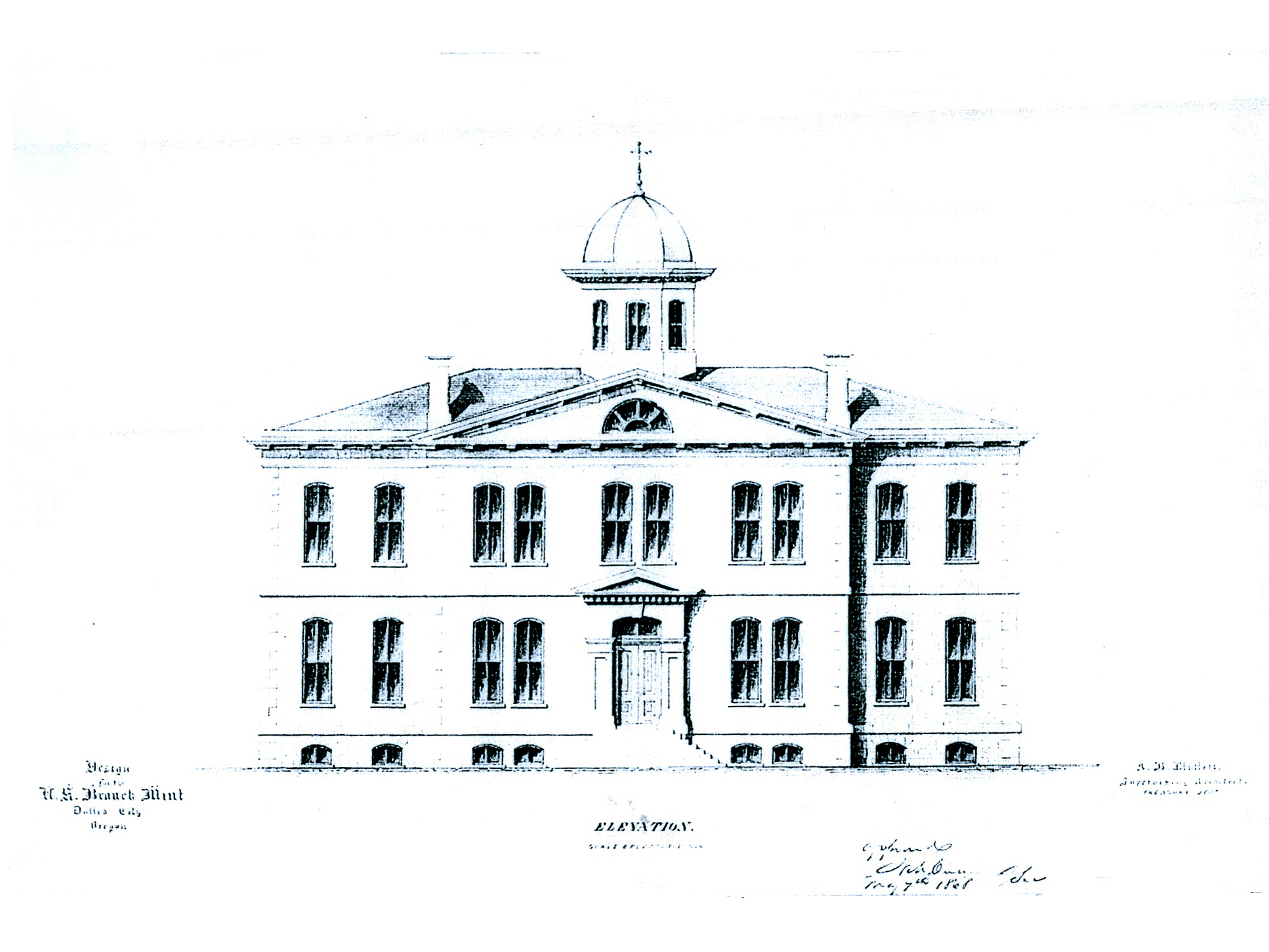
- Original design for the building

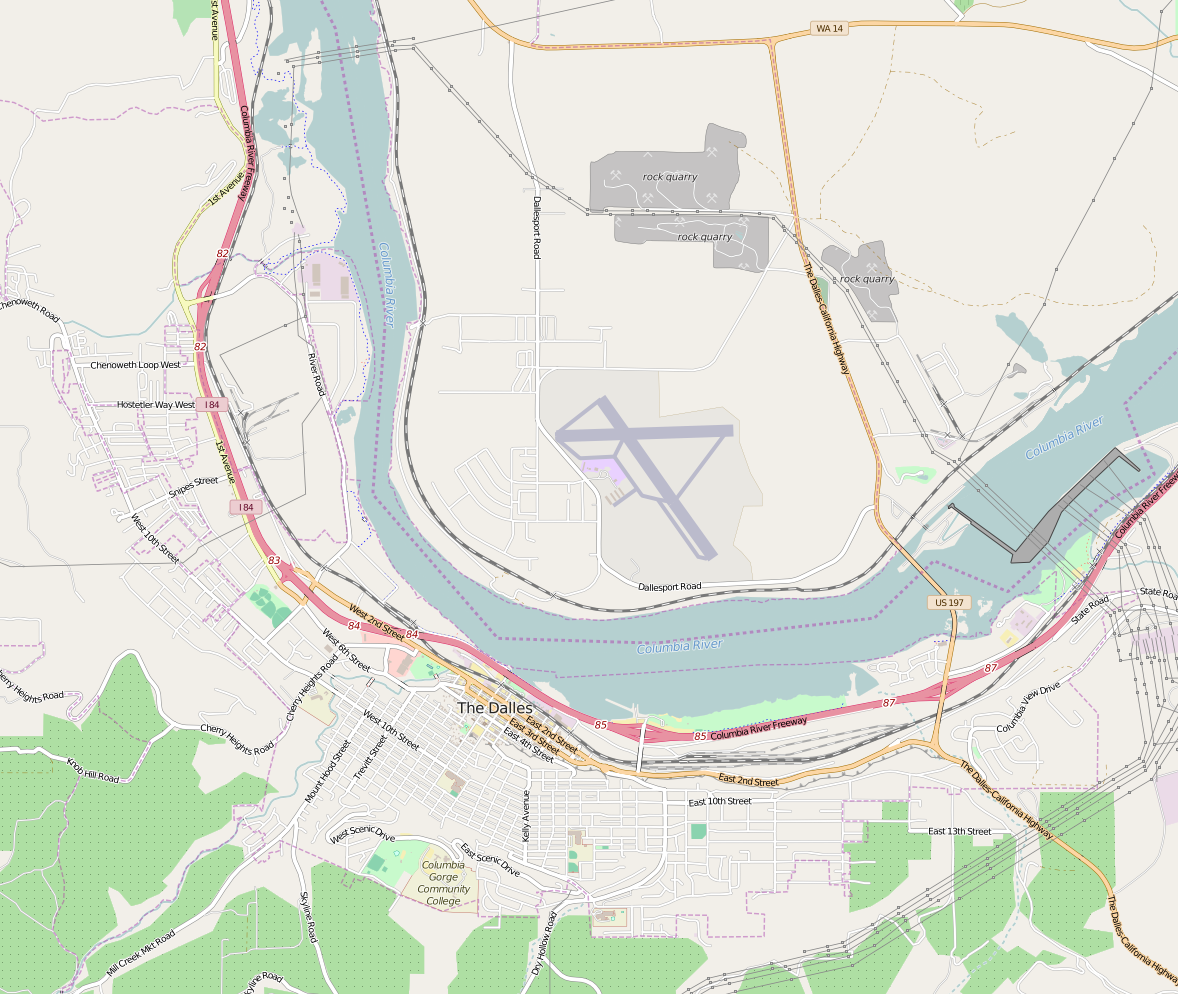
- Location within The Dalles OR

General information
- Location: The Dalles, Oregon, 710 E. Second Street; The Dalles, Oregon, US
- Coordinates: 45.598431°N 121.176716°W
- Construction started: 1869
- Cost: $105,000
- Owner: The Mint LLC

Height
- Height: 35 ft (11 m)

Dimensions
- Diameter: 50 ft × 60 ft (15 m × 18 m)

Technical details
- Floor count: 1

The Dalles Mint was to be a branch of the United States Mint in The Dalles in Oregon. Partially constructed in 1869, the planned two-story structure was never completed and the mint was never put into operation. Located in the downtown area of the city, the building was given to the state before it was sold to the public. The Mint building was most recently home to the Erin Glenn Winery.

== History ==
In 1860, gold was discovered in Idaho, and this along with a gold rush in Eastern Oregon created a need for a mint in the Pacific Northwest. Although the American Civil War was underway, 80,000 prospectors headed for the gold fields in 1862. Raw gold dust was used as currency in The Dalles because gold had to be shipped to the San Francisco Mint for processing. Demand grew for a mint closer to the mines.

Oregon U.S. Senator James W. Nesmith introduced an unsuccessful bill in 1862 to create a mint in Portland, Oregon. On July 4, 1864, Congress passed a bill to authorize a new branch of the mint at The Dalles (then known as Dalles City) for minting gold and silver coins. The next year another bill unsuccessfully attempted to change the location for the mint to Portland. William Logan was appointed as superintendent of the planned mint, but he died in the shipwreck of the S.S. Brother Jonathan en route to The Dalles.

Mary Laughlin donated a block of land on June 6, 1865, as a site for the mint and in 1869, construction finally began with Harvey A. Hogue as the superintendent of construction. However, the project was repeatedly delayed, and as the gold rushes waned and the Central Pacific Railroad opened, the mint become obsolete before the building could be completed and the minting equipment could be installed. The basement and first floor were completed in 1869, but in 1870 the construction was suspended, and officially abandoned in 1873. A fire destroyed much of the city in 1871, but the fact the mint was in the middle of the city block served as a firebreak and helped stop the fire.

In 1875, the federal government gave the structure to the State of Oregon, who in turn sold it to private interests in 1889. By 1940, the building was being used by the Columbia Warehouse Company. A fire in 1943 damaged the mint building, which in 1947 was repaired. The structure was also owned by Ralph's Transfer & Storage Co. before becoming the home of the Erin Glenn Winery in 2007 after a $1.5 million renovation.

== Structure ==
The single story, 35-foot (11 m) high granite building also has a basement. The building has a flat roof, with arched windows. Stone for the building was quarried from Mill Creek and shipped by wagon to the site. The building measured 50 feet (15 m) by 60 feet (18 m) and cost $105,000. Built in the center of the block, the original plans called for a two-storey building to be 90 feet (27 m) by 51 feet (16 m). A concrete block section was later added to the north side of the original structure. The building is eligible for the National Register of Historic Places (NRHP), but is just outside the NRHP-listed The Dalles Commercial Historic District.

== See also ==
- National Register of Historic Places listings in Wasco County, Oregon
- Carson City Mint
