= Cedar Guard Station No. 1019 =

- U.S. National Register of Historic Places
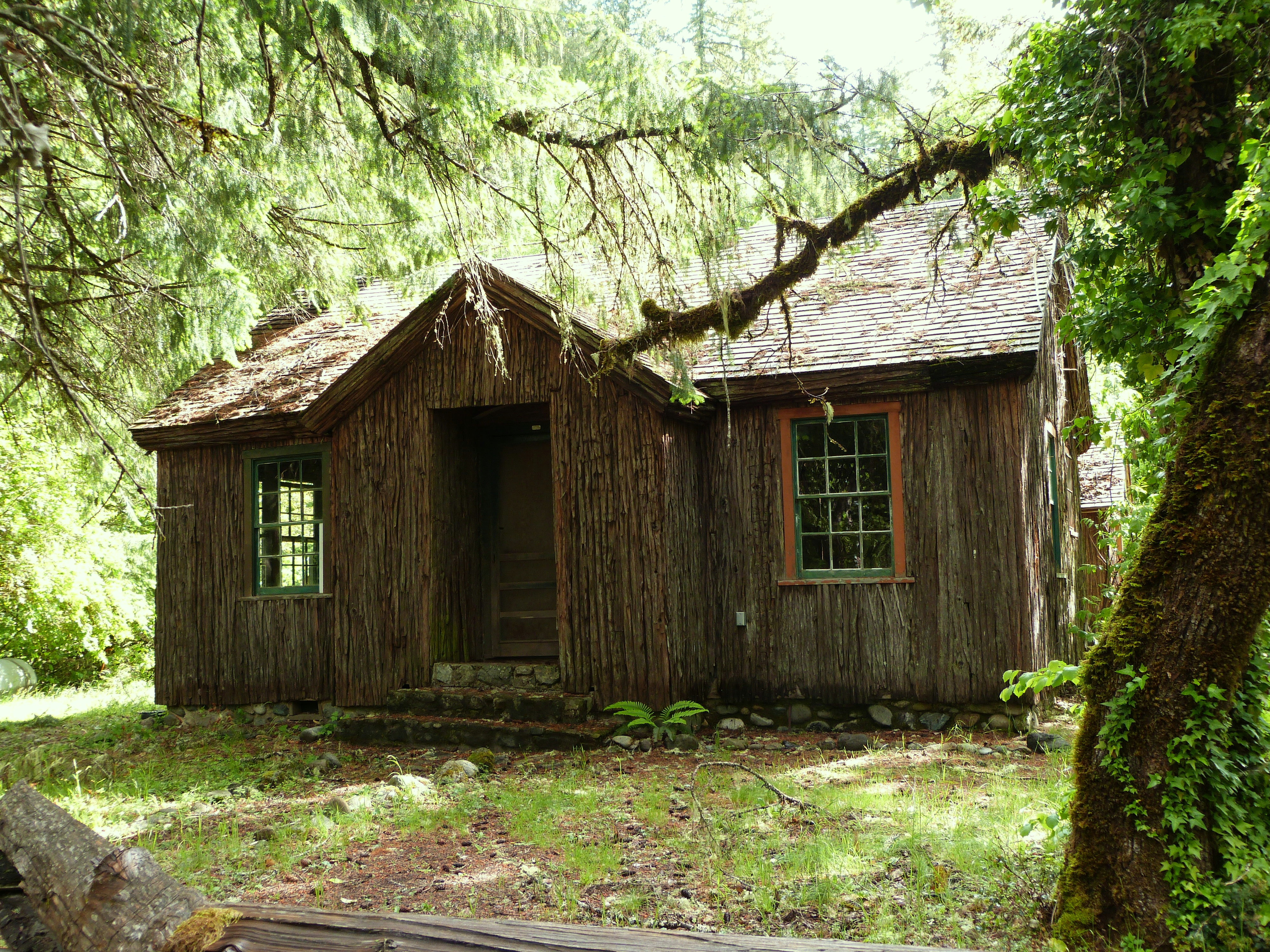
- The Cedar Guard Station in 2013.
- Location: Oregon Route 46, Rogue River – Siskiyou National Forest, Cave Junction, Oregon
- Coordinates: 42°08′26″N 123°27′24″W
- Area: 10 acres (4.0 ha)
- Built: 1933
- Architect: USDA Forest Svce. Architecture Group
- Architectural style: Rustic
- MPS: Depression-Era Buildings TR
- NRHP reference No.: 86000837
- Added to NRHP: April 8, 1986

The Cedar Guard Station No. 1019 in the Rogue River – Siskiyou National Forest, near Cave Junction, Oregon, United States, was built in 1933 by the Civilian Conservation Corps. It was listed on the National Register of Historic Places in 1986 for its architecture. It was designed by Forest Service architects in rustic style. The listing included two contributing buildings, a single dwelling and a garage, on a 10-acre (4.0 ha) area.

It is a one-story wood-frame building on a cobblestone foundation, with a centered chimney. Per its NRHP nomination, the exterior walls were of cedar bark, "with verges and eaves boxed by quarter-round cedar logs, bark on."

== See also ==
- National Register of Historic Places listings in Josephine County, Oregon
- Media related to Cedar Guard Station at Wikimedia Commons
