= Grants Pass Supervisor's Warehouse =

- U.S. National Register of Historic Places
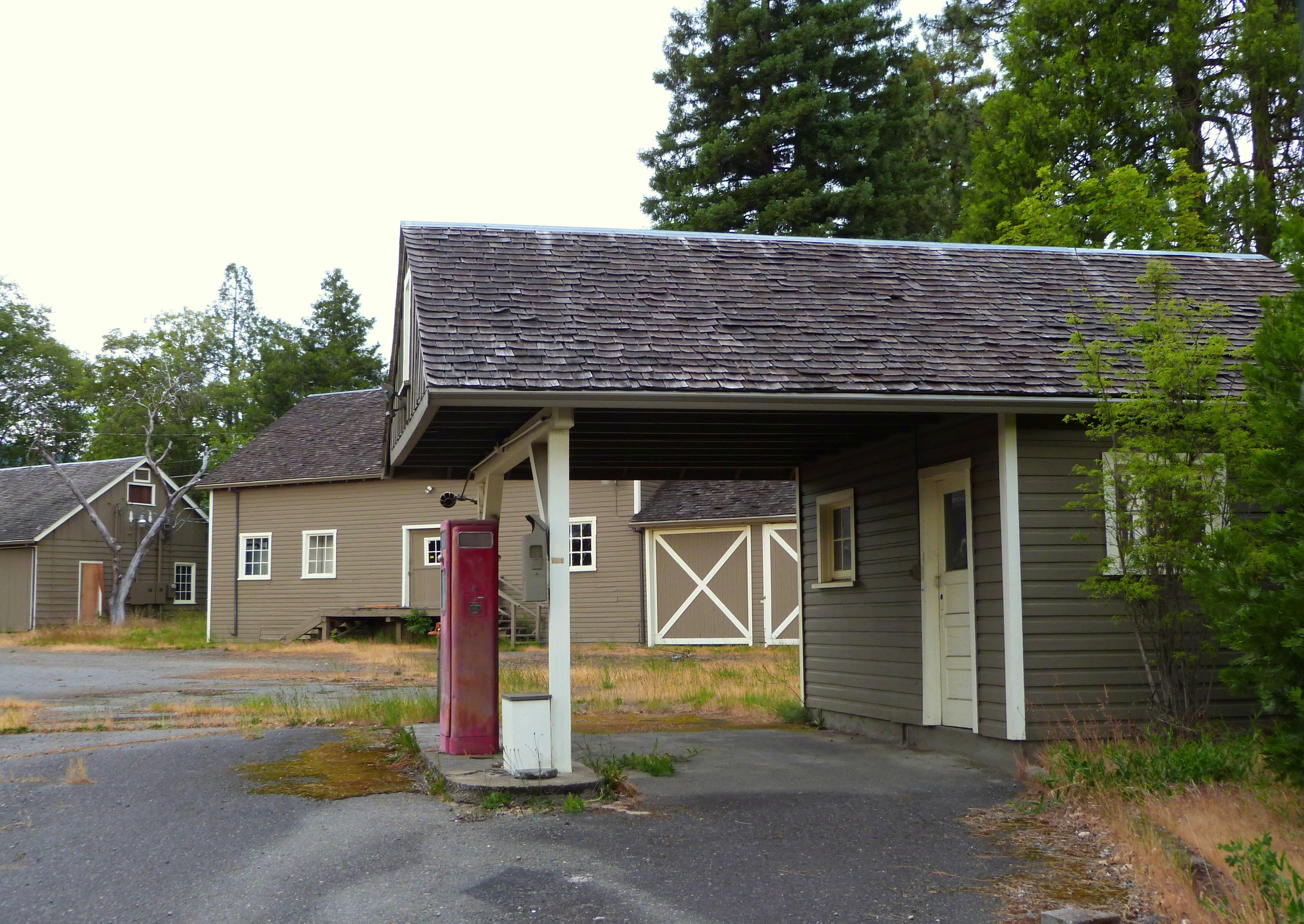
- The Grants Pass Supervisor's Warehouse in 2013. From left: the East Equipment Storage Building # 2310, the Engineering Warehouse # 2206, and the Gas House # 2501.

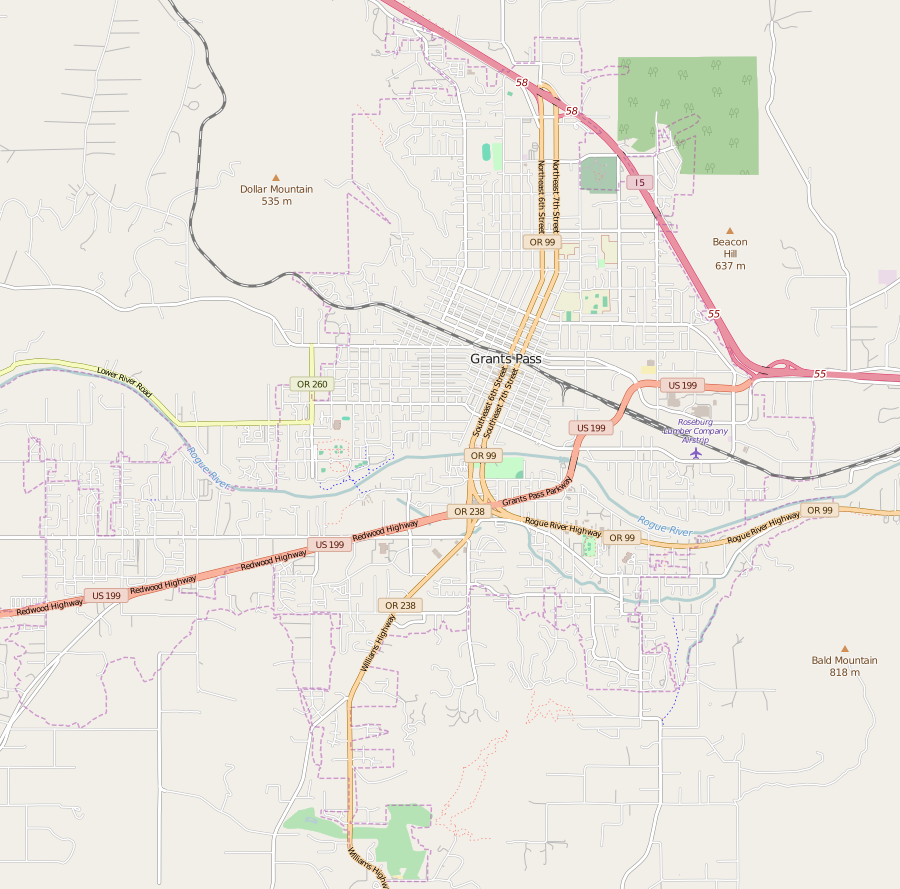
- Location within Grants Pass OR
- Location: 1012 SW L Street; Grants Pass, Oregon
- Coordinates: 42°26′14″N 123°20′20″W
- Area: 3.8 acres (1.5 ha)
- Built: 1933
- Built by: Civilian Conservation Corps
- Architect: Regional Office Architectural Group, United States Forest Service
- Architectural style: Rustic
- MPS: USDA Forest Service Administrative Buildings in Oregon and Washington Built by the CCC MPS
- NRHP reference No.: 91000163
- Added to NRHP: March 6, 1991

The Grants Pass Supervisor's Warehouse is a historic former national forest administrative facility in Grants Pass, Oregon, United States.

The warehouse complex was listed on the National Register of Historic Places in 1991.

== See also ==
- National Register of Historic Places listings in Josephine County, Oregon
