= James Tilton (surveyor) =

James Tilton (August 10, 1819, Wilmington, Delaware – November 23, 1878, Washington, D.C.) was the first Surveyor General of the Washington Territory, from August 1, 1854 to July 17, 1861. He was also a soldier and a politician.

James Tilton was born in Wilmington, Delaware, to Dr. James and Frances Gibson Tilton. The family moved to Indiana in 1827. He studied to become a surveyor, joined the United States Navy and was wounded twice in the Mexican–American War.

As a politician, Tilton campaigned vigorously in Indiana for presidential candidate Franklin Pierce, and was rewarded with the position of Surveyor General of the Washington Territory. He traveled to Olympia, Washington, arriving in the spring of 1855 ahead of his wife, children, other family members, and a young mulatto slave named Charles Mitchell. In 1855, Tilton tried to establish a principal meridian for the Washington Territory, as the pre-existing Oregon-based Willamette Meridian was not convenient for his purposes, but his proposal was rejected by his superior.

Tilton became involved in the case of his slave Charles Mitchell. Mitchell had been contacted by free blacks from the British Crown colony of Vancouver Island (where slavery was illegal). On September 24, 1860, the then twelve-year-old stowed away on the steamship Eliza Anderson, assisted by the ship's cook, James Allen. He was discovered; Captain John Fleming intended to return him to his master and locked the boy up before sailing into Victoria on September 25. However, he was forced by a writ of habeas corpus to surrender the boy to official custody so his legal status could be determined. James Tilton lodged a protest, and the story was covered by newspapers ranging from the Victoria Colonist to the San Francisco Daily Evening Bulletin. On September 26, Justice Cameron ruled that Charles Mitchell was free.

Tilton continued to live in Olympia for some years after his term as Surveyor General ended in 1861, when he was succeeded by Anson G. Henry. After his defeat in an election for territorial delegate, he returned briefly to Indiana and then to the family home in Wilmginton, but he returned to the Pacific Northwest to work for the Northern Pacific Railroad Company and is almost certainly the "railroad surveyor James Tilton" credited with being the first to climb Denny Mountain in 1867. He eventually returned east and died in Washington, D.C., in 1878.

The Tilton River and Fort Tilton (near what is now Fall City, Washington) are both named in his honor.
