= Aleck C. Smith =

American judge (1838–1875)

Alexander C. "Aleck" Smith (c. 1838 – May 9, 1875) was a justice of the Idaho Territorial Supreme Court from 1863 to 1866.

Born in Jacksonville, Illinois, Smith reportedly "read law somewhere in the West", and traveled to the Washington Territory in the 1850s where he served for a short time as a prosecuting attorney. He married the daughter of Anson G. Henry, who was then surveyor-general of the Washington Territory, and a close friend of President Abraham Lincoln.

Henry visited Washington, D.C., in the spring of 1863 where Lincoln insisted that he stay and accompany him in a visit of the Army of the Potomac. Henry secured Smith's appointment to the territorial supreme court at this time. Smith was appointed to the seat on March 10, 1863, and the appointment was confirmed by the United States Senate the following day. Smith "was only twenty-five at the time of his appointment and was assigned to cover the First District by Governor William H. Wallace". However, Smith's "inexperience and reputation for hard-drinking raised the ire of many in the territory, so much so that he was removed from office in 1866".

Following his ouster from the court, it was reported that Smith had moved to Vancouver, Washington Territory, to practice law. He died of consumption in Kalama, Washington Territory, on May 9, 1875.

Political offices
Preceded by Newly established court	Justice of the Idaho Territorial Supreme Court; 1863–1866	Succeeded by John Cummins
