= Anson G. Henry =

Physician to Abraham Lincoln (1804–1865)

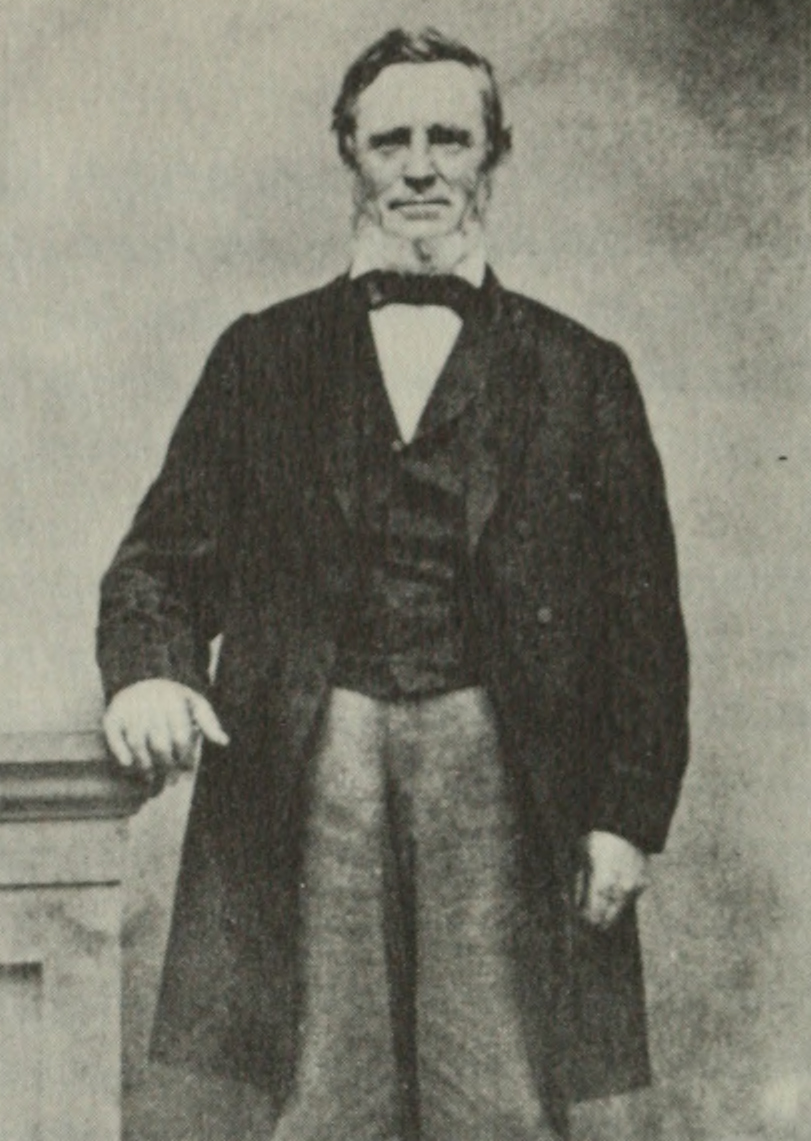
- Henry c. 1832 – c. 1865
- Born: October 3, 1804; Richfield, New York
- Died: July 30, 1865 (aged 60); Ocean off of Crescent City, California
- Occupations: Physician, politician
- Years active: 1827-1865
- Known for: friend to President Abraham Lincoln, Indian agent to Oregon tribes

Anson G. Henry (October 3, 1804 - July 30, 1865) was a medical doctor and politician, who is best known for his friendship with Abraham Lincoln. Henry received patronage appointments to Oregon Territory through Lincoln from 1852 onwards, first as an Indian agent and then as Surveyor General of Washington Territory. He died when the steamer Brother Jonathan ran aground near Crescent City, California and sank.

== Life ==
Anson G. Henry was born on October 3, 1804, in Richfield, New York. He was the oldest son of the five sons and three daughters of Gordon Henry (1777–1857), a farmer of Protestant Irish descent, and his wife, Phebe (Cheeseman) Henry. Henry gained his medical degree in 1827 from Cincinnati College and the Medical College of Ohio. After a series of failed business ventures in Michigan and Louisville, Kentucky, Henry married Eliza Dunlap Bradstreet (1813-1892) and moved to Springfield, Illinois in October 1832. In 1832 and 1833, Henry assisted with the cholera outbreaks in St. Louis and Jacksonville, Illinois, gaining recognition as an expert in treatment of cholera. Henry met Abraham Lincoln in Springfield, quickly becoming friends, though Henry was five years older.

Henry became heavily involved in politics. He was one of three commissioners responsible for overseeing the construction of the State Capitol in 1837. Accused of allowing cost overruns, he was exonerated by an investigating committee suggested by Lincoln. After Mary Todd broke the engagement with Lincoln on January 1, 1841, he regularly sought out Henry's company. A fellow state senator later recounted, "Mr. Lincoln boarded at William Butler’s, near to Dr. Henry’s, where I boarded. The missing days, from January 13th to 19th, Mr. Lincoln spent several hours each day at Dr. Henry’s; a part of these days I remained with Mr. Lincoln. His most intimate friends had no fears of his injuring himself. He was very sad and melancholy, but being subject to these spells, nothing serious was apprehended." In 1850, Henry assisted in the formation of the Illinois State Medical Society and was appointed vice-president.

=== Oregon ===
In 1850, Lincoln wrote a letter to Thomas Ewing, the first Secretary of the Interior, urging Henry's appointment as a patronage appointment as an Indian agent. Later than year on June 24, 1850, Henry received an appointment as an Indian agent for the Oregon Territory, however he did not leave until April 6, 1852, taking his wife and five children. The family arrived in Lafayette, Oregon in October, where he began practicing medicine and accepted an appointment as deputy surveyor of Yamhill County. In 1853, he successfully ran for a seat representing Yamhill in the Oregon Territorial Legislature, serving in the 6th Legislative Session from December 1854 to February 1855. In 1855, he participated in the Rogue River Wars. As a member of the Oregon Mounted Volunteers, he served as commissary, and reportedly favored the genocide of Native Americans.

"I found that very little preparation had been made for the comfort or successful treatment of the large number of naked diseased Indians, who had been collected together suddenly from all parts of the territory. I found them sick & dying under circumstances which appealed most strongly to the sympathies of the human heart."

— Anson G. Henry, Letter to Absalom F. Hedges, Oregon Superintendent of Indian Affairs, dated January 5, 1857

In 1856, Henry was appointed physician to the Grand Ronde Indian Reservation, receiving an annual salary of $2000, more than could be achieved by farming. He arrived at the reservation in May 1856, later providing among the most detailed accounts of the health situation in Oregon's early reservations. His reports indicate that up to two-thirds of the population of the settlement were sick, all of which were under his care as the sole doctor.

Henry and Lincoln corresponded regularly by mail even after Henry moved to Oregon. On July 4, 1860, Lincoln wrote, "Long before this you have learned who was nominated at Chicago. We know not what a day may bring forth; but, to-day, it looks as if the Chicago ticket will be elected." In May, Lincoln had received the nomination of the Republican Party as its presidential candidate and would go on to win the presidential election. One of Lincoln's first presidential appointments was to name Henry as Surveyor-General of Washington Territory, succeeding James Tilton, and serving from 1861 to 1865. Henry visited Washington, DC in the spring of 1863 where Lincoln insisted that he stay and accompany him in a visit of the Army of the Potomac. Henry's daughter had married Washington territory prosecuting attorney Aleck C. Smith, for whom Henry successfully sought an appointment to the territorial supreme court at this time.

Following the 1864 United States presidential election, Henry returned to Washington, DC in anticipation of a high political appointment in the Interior Department. Mary Todd Lincoln and Noah Brooks considered him an ally and sought his appointment as Commissioner of Indian Affairs. However, the President eventually informed Henry that he did not want to remove William P. Dole in favor of another friend. Disappointed, Henry traveled to Richmond, Virginia, where he was during the assassination of the president on April 14, 1865. In a letter to his wife, Henry recounted his reaction to seeing Lincoln's corpse and his attempts to comfort Mary Todd. Henry stayed in the White House for the next six weeks, acting as physician to care for the distraught Mary Todd, eventually accompanying her back to Chicago.

After leaving Mary Todd Lincoln, he began making his way back to his family in Oregon. On July 28, 1865, Henry boarded Brother Jonathan in San Francisco for a voyage to Portland, Oregon. After running aground on the 30th, the vessel sank; killing over 200 passengers and crew, including Henry. On August 30, Mary Todd wrote Henry's widow, "We have both been called upon to resign, to our Heavenly Father, two of the best men & the most devoted husbands, that two unhappy women, ever possessed."

== Bibliography ==
- Pratt, Harry E (1944). Dr. Anson G. Henry : Lincoln's physician and friend. Harrogate, Tenn.: Lincoln Memorial University, Dept. of Lincolniana.
- Temple, Wayne Calhoun (1988). "Dr. Anson G. Henry, personal physician to the Lincolns". Historical Bulletin. 43. Madison, WI: Lincoln Fellowship of Wisconsin. OCLC 18451835.
