= Hugo Community Baptist Church =

Historic church in Oregon, United States

- U.S. National Register of Historic Places
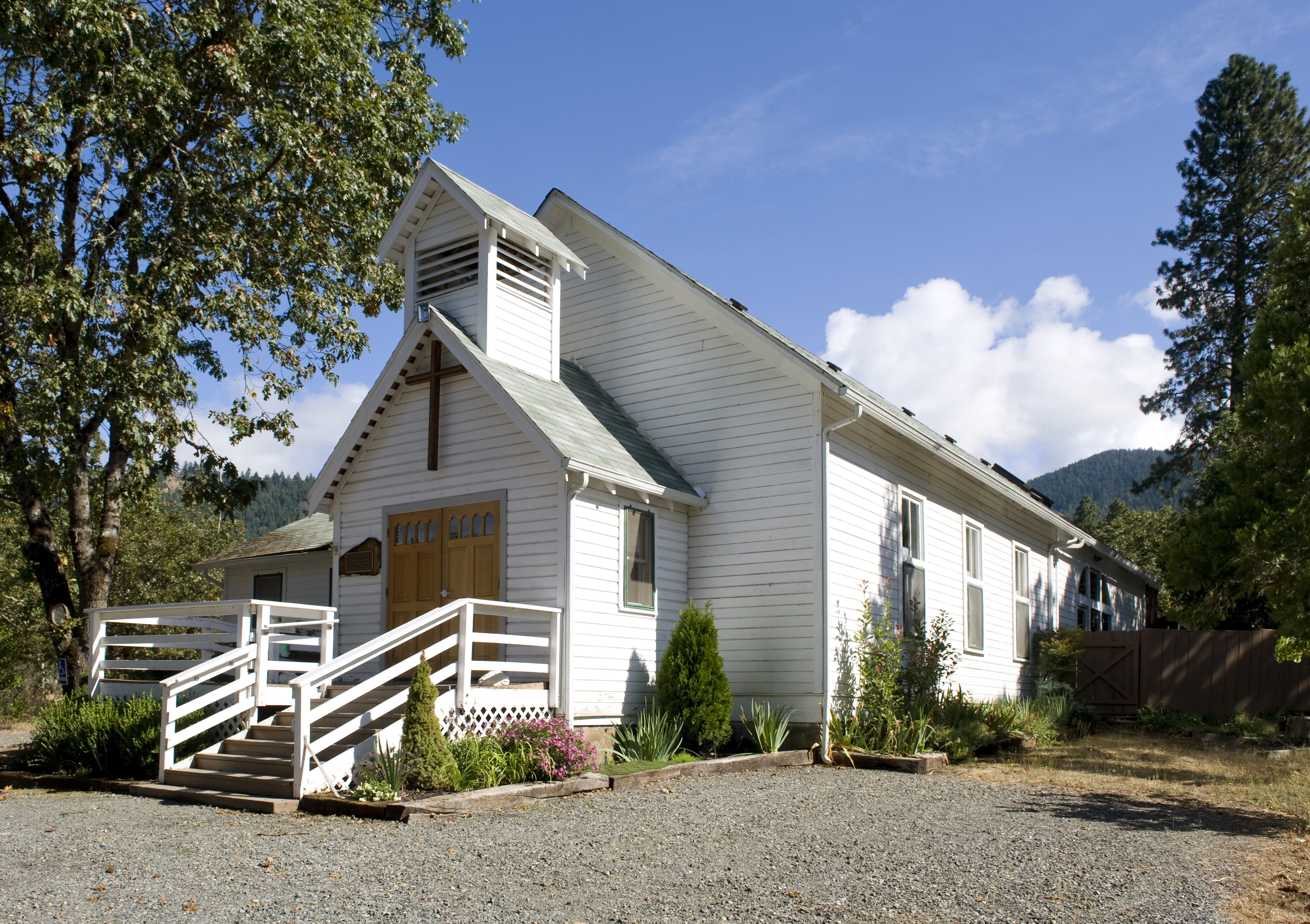
- The Hugo Community Baptist Church in 2010

- Location within Oregon Location within the United States
- Location: 6501 Hugo Road; Hugo, Oregon
- Nearest city: Grants Pass, Oregon
- Coordinates: 42°35′05″N 123°24′07″W
- Area: 1.69 acres (0.68 ha)
- Built: 1913
- Architectural style: Craftsman
- NRHP reference No.: 90001587
- Added to NRHP: October 25, 1990

Hugo Community Baptist Church is a church and historic church building located in the rural community of Hugo, near Grants Pass, Oregon, United States.

The church was listed on the National Register of Historic Places in 1990.

== See also ==
- National Register of Historic Places listings in Josephine County, Oregon
