= Requa, California =

Unincorporated community in California, United States

Requa Rek'woy (Yurok)
- Unincorporated community
- Location in California
- Coordinates: 41°32′48″N 124°03′59″W
- Country: United States
- State: California
- County: Del Norte County
- Named for: A nearby pre-colonial Native-American settlement whose name means "Mouth of the creek" in the Yurok language
- Elevation: 125 ft (38 m)

Requa (Yurok: Rek'woy) is an unincorporated community in Del Norte County, California, United States. It is on the north bank of the Klamath River less than one mile (1.6 km) from its mouth, at an elevation of 125 feet (38 m).

Requa is a small town on the north bank of the Klamath River. The town was settled by Europeans in 1851 after prospectors arrived. Requa is a Yurok word translated to “mouth of the creek”, the name of a pre-colonial Native-American village (Rekwoi) one mile upstream from today's Requa.

A post office operated at Requa 1878–1970, with closures in 1883 and moves in 1895 and 1898.

On May 20, 2012, Requa was the first town on the North American continent to experience an annular eclipse from the centerline since May 10, 1994.

Requa was home to one of several salmon canneries for the Klamath Packing & Trading Co. which was founded in 1881. At its peak, the company was reporting over 10,000 salmon brought in per day, holding the record of 17,000 one day in 1912.

A portion of the Requa land is part of Redwood National Park, and includes a world-class overlook above the mouth of the Klamath River, providing opportunities for whale and bird watching, among others.
