= John and Susanna Ahlf House =

Historic house in Oregon, United States

- U.S. National Register of Historic Places
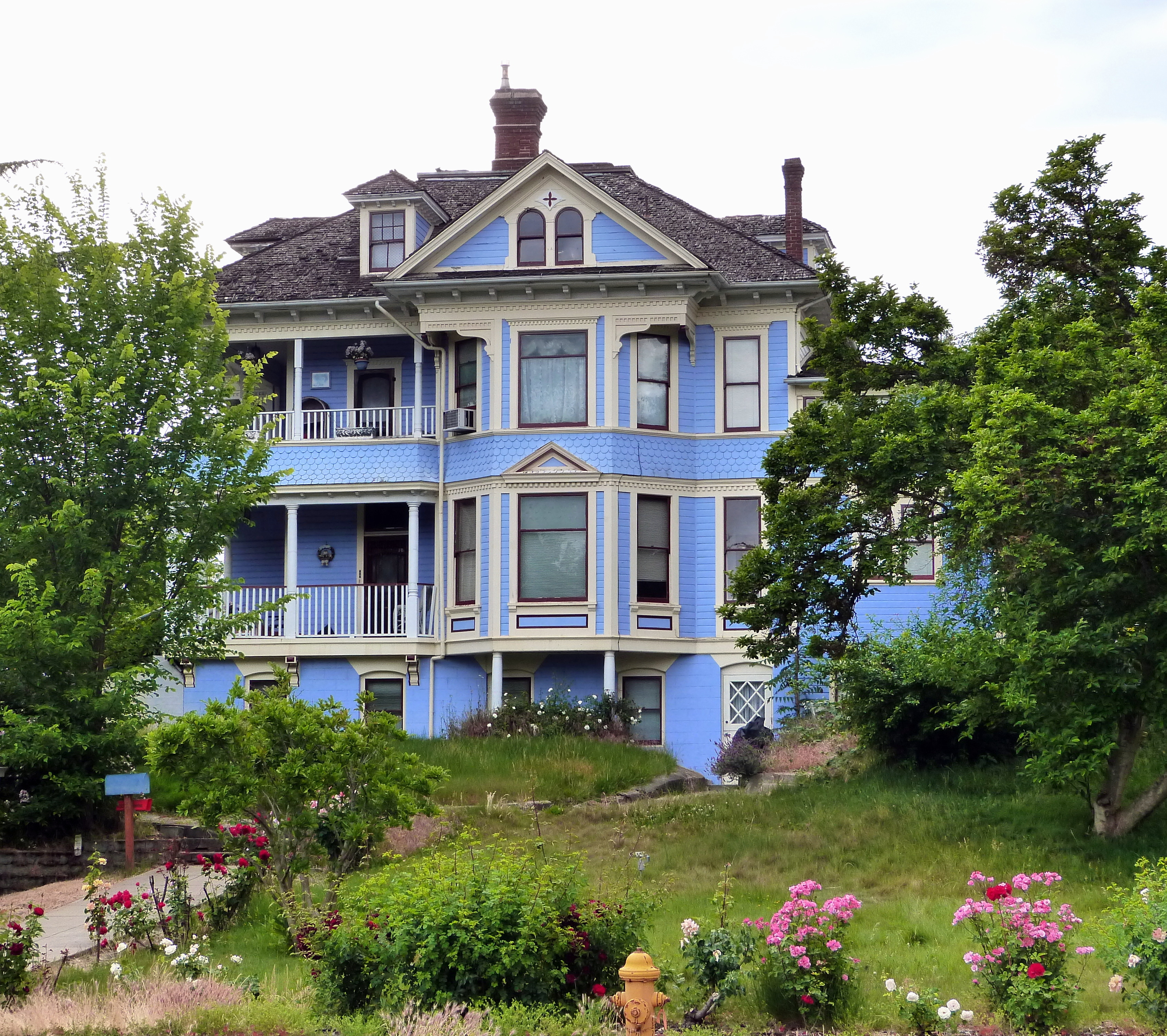
- The Ahlf House in 2013

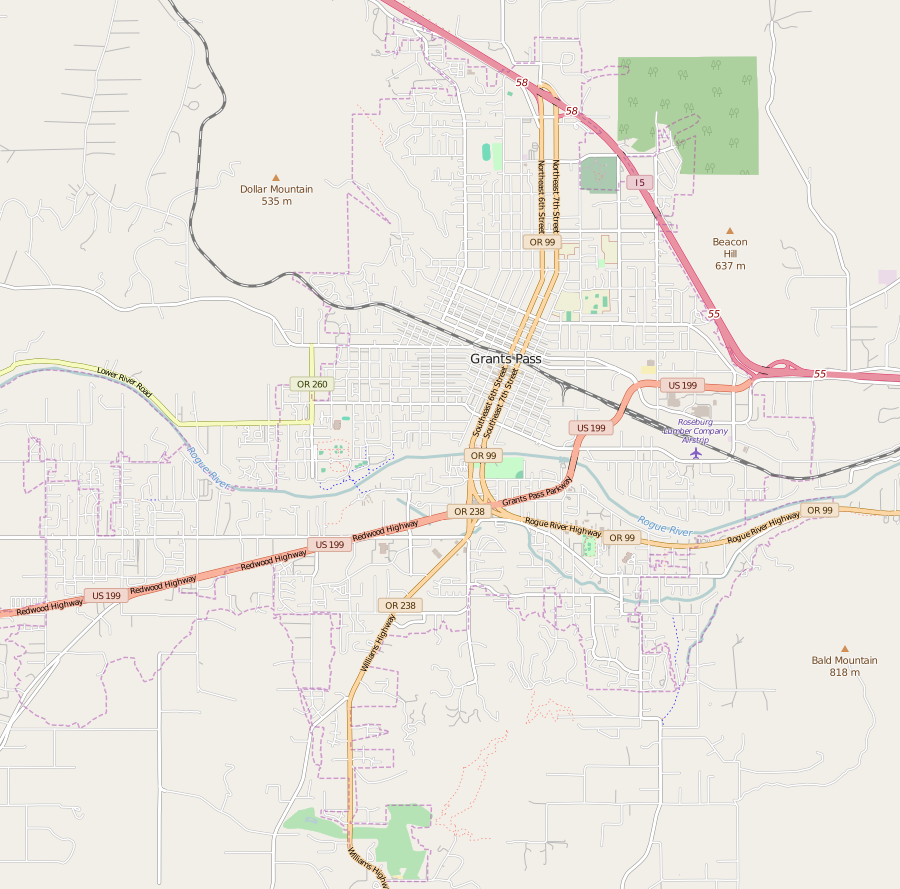
- Location within Grants Pass OR
- Location: 762 NW 6th Street; Grants Pass, Oregon
- Coordinates: 42°26′44″N 123°19′26″W
- Area: Less than 1 acre (0.40 ha)
- Built: 1902
- Architect: Isaac A. Palmer
- Architectural style: Queen Anne
- NRHP reference No.: 83002154
- Added to NRHP: May 9, 1983

The John and Susanna Ahlf House is a historic residence in Grants Pass, Oregon, United States. Built in 1902, it is the finest remaining example of the Queen Anne style in Grants Pass, and was the most prominent home in the city prior to World War I. It was built for John Ahlf (1856–1932), a German immigrant and meat packer who became one of the leading businessmen of the Rogue Valley.

The house was added to the National Register of Historic Places in 1983.

== See also ==
- National Register of Historic Places listings in Josephine County, Oregon
