= Newman United Methodist Church =

Historic church in Oregon, United States

- U.S. National Register of Historic Places
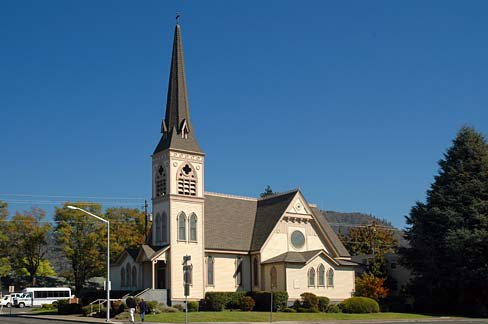
- The Newman United Methodist Church in 2005

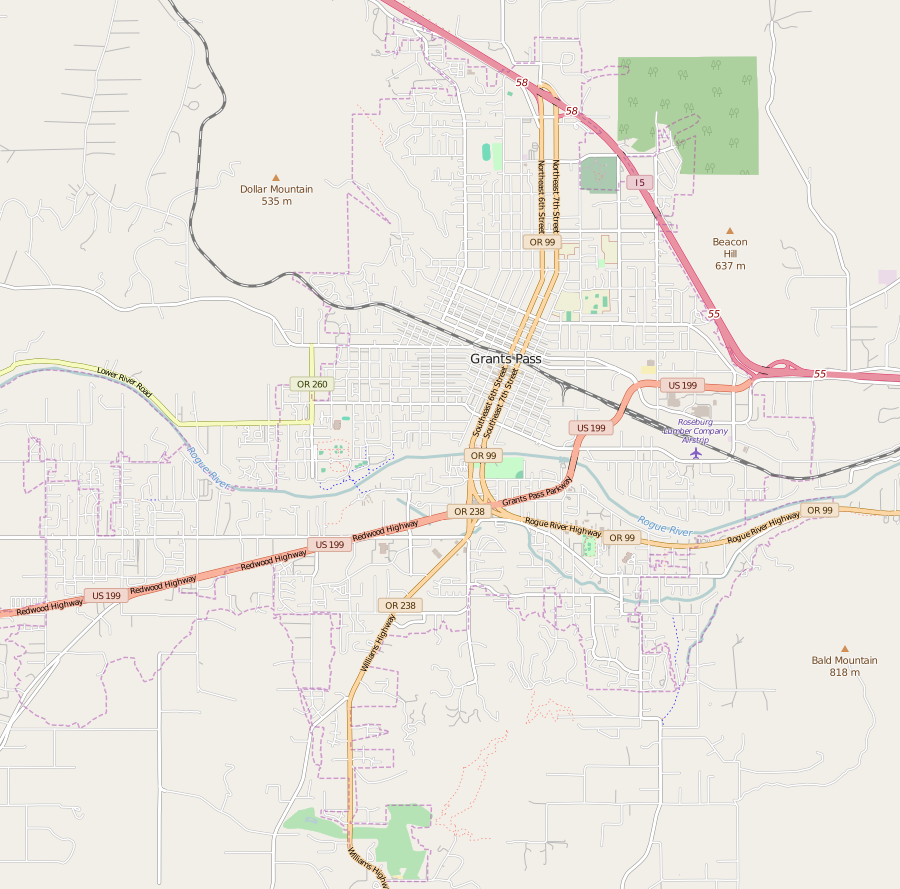
- Location within Grants Pass OR
- Location: 128 NE B Street; Grants Pass, Oregon
- Coordinates: 42°26′35″N 123°19′28″W
- Area: 15,000 square feet (1,400 m^{2})
- Built: 1889
- Architect: Methodist Episcopal Church Board (Note: Standard plan number 6.)
- Architectural style: Gothic Revival
- NRHP reference No.: 77001103
- Added to NRHP: December 23, 1977

The Newman United Methodist Church is a church and historic church building located in Grants Pass, Oregon, United States.

The church was listed on the National Register of Historic Places in 1977.

== See also ==
- National Register of Historic Places listings in Josephine County, Oregon
