= Gasquet Ranger Station Historic District =

Historic district in California, United States

- U.S. National Register of Historic Places
- U.S. Historic district
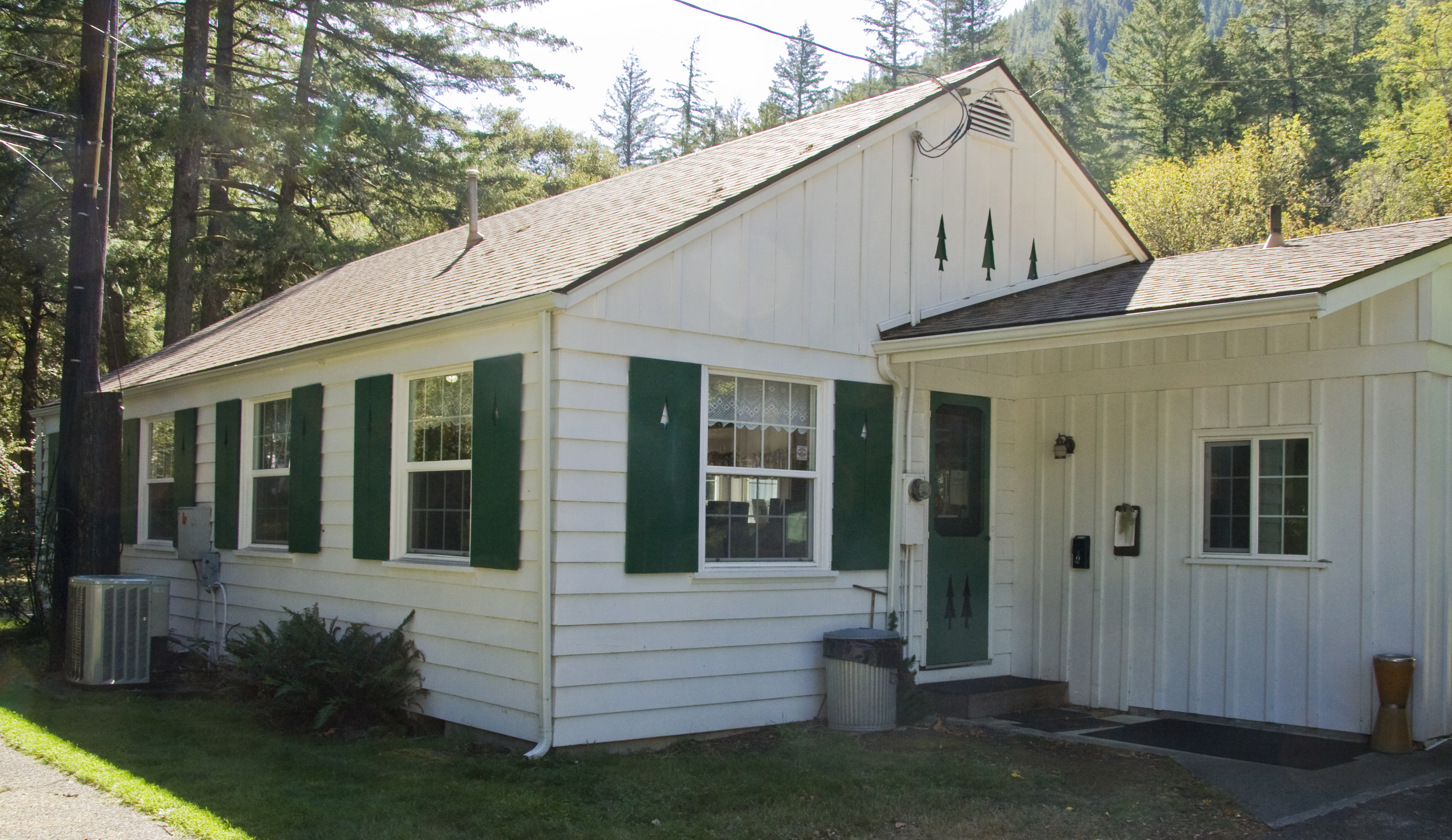
- Gasquet Ranger Station office from the rear

- Location within California Location within the United States
- Location: 10600 CA 199, Gasquet, California
- Coordinates: 41°50′41″N 123°57′56″W
- Area: 3 acres (1.2 ha)
- Architect: Civilian Conservation Corps; U.S. Forest Service
- Architectural style: Forest Service Rustic
- NRHP reference No.: 98000262
- Added to NRHP: March 26, 1998

The Gasquet Ranger Station Historic District comprises a compound of buildings associated with the Gasquet Ranger District of Six Rivers National Forest. The U.S. Forest Service complex is located along the Smith River on U.S. Route 199 in Del Norte County, California, within Smith River National Recreation Area. Most of the buildings were built by the Civilian Conservation Corps between 1933 and 1939. Seven buildings and a rock wall remain of the CCC-built structures. The district office, the assistant district ranger's residence, a warehouse, two garages and a fuel house were built in the Forest Service rustic style that prevailed at the time. The style is reflected in distinctive detailing, including a recurring pine tree cut-out logo that appears on gables and shutters.

== Description ==
The ranger station is located on a terrace between the Middle Fork of the Smith River and US 199. The main office is a 1-1/2 story frame structure completed in 1938, facing U.S. 199. The main roof is end-gabled, with a large cross-gabled front porch. The building measures about 37 feet (11 m) by 41 feet (12 m). In plan it originally was two rooms downstairs, with an attic storage room. Pine tree cut-outs are painted green against the white gables, and the stationary shutters feature similar cut-outs. The porch lights are designed to resemble fire lookout cabins. Over time there have been modest additions and changes to the interior.

The assistant ranger's residence was also completed in 1938, measuring about 30 feet (9.1 m) by 46 feet (14 m). The one-story house is end-gabled. The front porch is supported by curved wood brackets. It has been little altered. Two garages were built in either 1933 or 1938, and feature pine tree cutouts on their gables. A warehouse, built about 1936, is actually three adjoining structures. The fuel house was built about 1934.

The district ranger's residence is a Colonial Revival structure that is more in accordance with eastern design practice than was usual in California, even including a full basement. Rock walls in the vicinity were built by the CCC, as was another wall near the highway. There were once four more CCC buildings: a barn, a messhall/bunkhouse, a woodshed and another residence. Several newer buildings are included in the historic district but are regarded as non-contributing.

== History ==
The Gasquet Ranger Station was built beginning in 1933 to replace the Smith Fork Ranger Station, located to the west of the present station. The station at the time was part of Siskiyou National Forest. The district ranger, Adolph Nilsson, directed CCC forces at the Gasquet CCC camp to build the new station to plans provided by the Forest Service regional office. The station's presence at the time in the Northwest Region meant that northwestern design motifs such as the cutout pine trees were employed, making the station unusual for California ranger stations. The exception was the ranger's residence, which was built to a plan that appeared in the July 1930 Ladies Home Journal, apparently at the instigation of Mrs. Nilsson.

The Gasquet Ranger Station Historic District was placed on the National Register of Historic Places on March 26, 1998. It is the primary Forest Service visitor contact point in Smith River National Recreation Area.
