= Brother Jonathan (steamer) =

American paddle steamer (1850–1865)

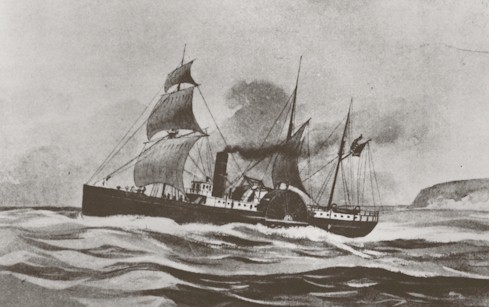
- Brother Jonathan after the 1861 refit

History
- Name: Brother Jonathan (1851 – c.1856); Commodore (c.1856 – 1861); Brother Jonathan (1861–)
- Namesake: Brother Jonathan
- Owner: Edward Mills (1851–1852); Cornelius Vanderbilt (1852 – c.1856); Captain John Wright (c.1856 – 1861); California Steam Navigation Co. (1861–)
- Completed: 1851
- Fate: Wrecked July 30, 1865

General characteristics
- Tonnage: 1359 52/95 tons burthen
- Length: 220 ft 11 in (67.34 m)
- Beam: 36 ft (11 m)
- Depth: 21 ft (6.4 m)
- Sail plan: barkentine
- Brother Jonathan (Shipwreck Site)
- U.S. National Register of Historic Places
- California Historical Landmark
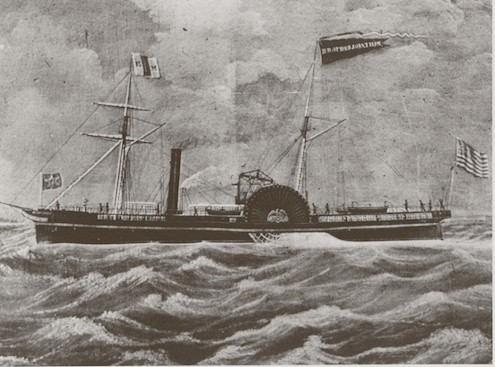
- Brother Jonathan in 1851

- Location within California
- Location: About 4.5 mi (7.2 km) SW of Point St. George
- Nearest city: Crescent City, California
- NRHP reference No.: 02000535
- CHISL No.: 541
- Added to NRHP: May 21, 2002

Brother Jonathan was a paddle steamer that struck an uncharted rock near Point St. George, off the coast of Crescent City, California, on July 30, 1865. The ship was carrying 244 passengers and crew, with a large shipment of gold. Only 19 people survived, making it the deadliest shipwreck up to that time on the Pacific Coast of the United States. Based on the passenger and crew list, 225 people are believed to have died. Its location was not discovered until 1993 and a portion of the gold was recovered in 1996. The ship was also instrumental in setting off the 1862 smallpox epidemic in the Pacific Northwest, which killed thousands of Indigenous people in the region.

== Initial construction ==
The ship was built by Perrine, Patterson, and Stack in Williamsburg, Brooklyn, and launched on November 2, 1850. It was commissioned by Edward Mills, a New Yorker who tried to operate a shipping business during the California Gold Rush, and was named after Brother Jonathan, a character personifying the region of New England. When built in 1851, it was 220 feet 11 inches (67.34 m) long and 36 ft (11 m) wide. Its route was from New York to Chagres, Panama, and on its first journey it set a record for the then-fastest round-trip – 31 days. Passengers would cross the Isthmus of Panama and make their way north to California via another ship.

In 1852 the ship was purchased by Cornelius Vanderbilt, who operated a competing line, to replace one of his ships that had been wrecked. Vanderbilt had Brother Jonathan sail around Cape Horn and used it on the Pacific side of the route. Vanderbilt also had the steamer modified to accommodate more passengers.

== Uses ==
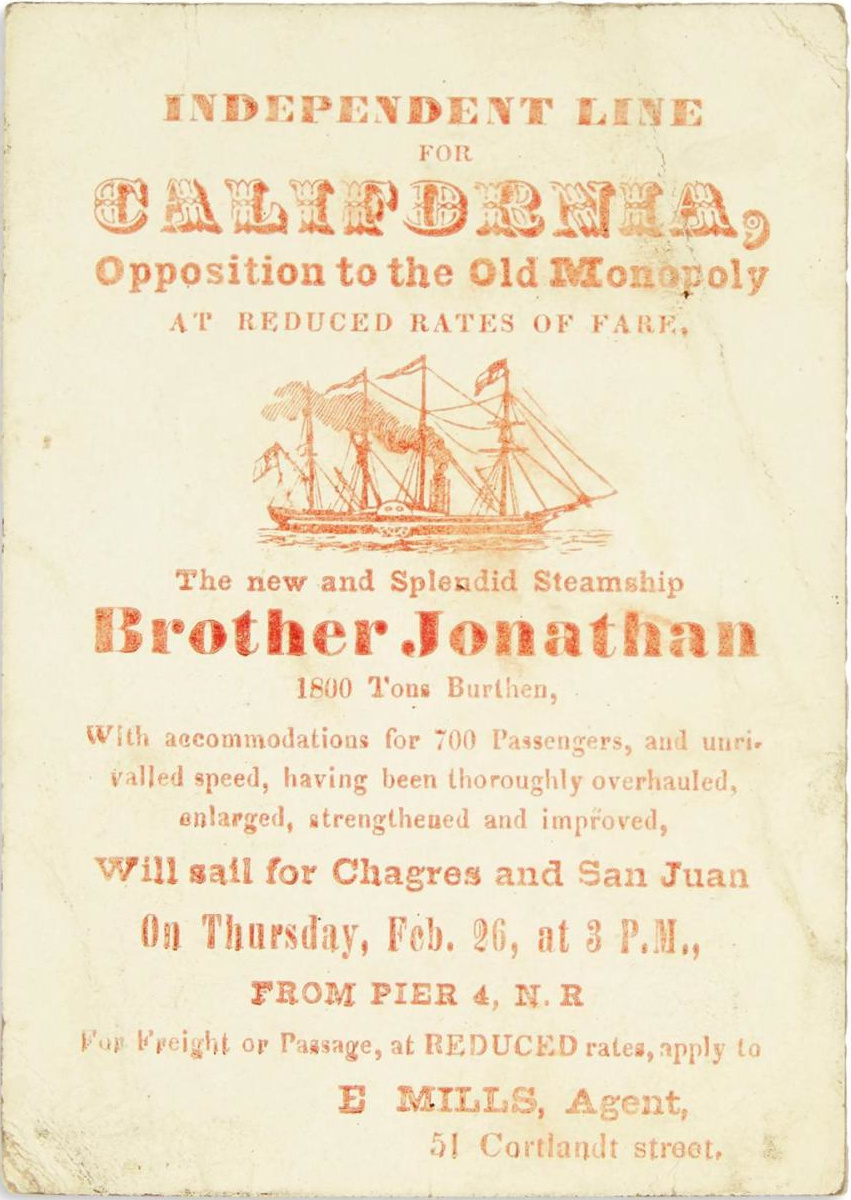
Sailing card

Vanderbilt's company had had an exclusive contract ferrying passengers across the isthmus through Nicaragua, but in 1856 the Nicaraguan government cancelled the agreement. The ship was then sold to Captain John Wright, renamed Commodore and put on West Coast routes, including from its new home port of San Francisco to British Columbia, as gold prospectors travelled to the Fraser Canyon Gold Rush.

The ship played a small but symbolic role in the history of the state of Oregon. After President James Buchanan signed the bill admitting Oregon to the Union on February 14, 1859, the news was wired to St. Louis, carried by stagecoach to San Francisco, and loaded on Commodore on March 10. On March 15, the ship docked in Portland, delivering the official notification of statehood to the people of Oregon.

By 1861, the ship had fallen into disrepair and was sold again to the California Steam Navigation Company, who retrofitted it, restored the original name of Brother Jonathan, and kept it on the northward route from San Francisco to Vancouver via Portland, allowing prospectors to work the Salmon River Gold Rush. Over the next several years, the vessel gained a reputation as being one of the finest steamers on the Pacific Coast, being the fastest ship to make the run, sixty-nine hours each way. (Note: Other than Powers and Bowers above, a detailed history of Brother Jonathan is found generally at Lomax. See also, "Brother Jonathan Began Life on East Coast, Sank in 1865". The Daily Triplicate. September 16, 2000. p. 9A.)

However, in the summer of 1865 the ship suffered a collision with a barkentine on the Columbia River, damaging the hull. Captain Samuel DeWolf, who had just assumed command of the vessel in June, recommended that the ship be repaired in dry dock, but the company performed the repairs while still in the water, as there was so much business that a backlog of cargo began to form.

=== 1862 smallpox epidemic ===
When Brother Jonathan traveled north from San Francisco and arrived in Victoria, British Columbia, on 12 March 1862, it brought along a miner infected with smallpox. When the disease began to infect Indigenous people camped around Victoria, colonial authorities forced them to leave but as they made their return trip home, they spread the disease throughout the Salish Sea area and Pacific Northwest, from Puget Sound to southern Alaska. According to historian John Lutz, "The citizens of Victoria, one could say, panicked. Or, one could say, with a less charitable view, that they deliberately drove the Indigenous people out of town, and that spread the disease back to their home communities up and down the coast."

Estimates of the death toll vary. Portland State University anthropologist Robert T. Boyd suggests that, by the end of 1862, 14,000 Indigenous people along the coast had died from the outbreak. Other estimates suggest that, over the next year, at least 30,000 Indigenous people in the region died. At least half of the population of Indigenous peoples along the coast died, leaving behind "mass graves, deserted villages, traumatized survivors and societal collapse" that facilitated the colonization of the area.

== Shipwreck ==
On its last voyage, the ship had been heavily loaded and according to DeWolf's widow, he felt that the ship sat too low in the water, even without the passengers, but he was told that if he did not set sail, he would be fired and replaced by someone else. When it came time to depart, the bottom of the ship had sunk into the mud and they had to wait until high tide for a tugboat to pull her out. However, later historians determined that the actual load was no more than 700 tons, well below its 900-ton carrying capacity.

Within hours of leaving San Francisco Bay for Portland and Victoria, it ran into a gale. Most of the passengers became seasick and stayed in their cabins. Early on Sunday morning, July 30, 1865, the steamer anchored in Crescent City harbor on the first leg of its trip. After leaving the safety of the bay that Sunday afternoon, the ship encountered more stormy conditions. The seas were so bad near the California / Oregon border that the captain ordered the ship turned around for the harbor of Crescent City. Fifty-five minutes later on that return and close to port, the ship struck a rock, tearing a large hole in the hull. A heavy ore crusher had been loaded in the cargo hold directly above the portion of the hull that had been repaired a month earlier and smashed through it as well. Within five minutes, the captain realized the ship was foundering and ordered the passengers and crew to abandon ship.

Although there were enough lifeboats to hold all of the people on board, only three boats could be deployed. Acts of courage and desperation, fear and self-sacrifice, were numerous. The rough waves capsized the first lifeboat that was lowered and smashed the second against the vessel's sides. Only a single surfboat, holding eleven crew members, five women, and three children, managed to escape and make it safely to Crescent City. Four boats in the harbor tried to reach the sinking ship but were forced to turn back by the storm.

Among the victims were:

- Brigadier General George Wright, the former Union Commander of the Department of the Pacific, now on his way to take over the Department of the Columbia, and his wife Margaret
- Dr. Anson G. Henry, Surveyor General of the Washington Territory, who was also Abraham Lincoln's physician and close friend
- William Logan, who was appointed superintendent of The Dalles Mint in Oregon and whose death was partially responsible for the mint's failure to begin operating.

For its final voyage, crates of gold coins had been loaded on the vessel, including the annual treaty payments in gold for Indian tribes, Wells Fargo shipments consigned for Portland and Vancouver, and gold carried on board by the passengers. A large ship's safe safeguarded jewelry, more gold coins, and gold bars. The gold alone was valued at $50 million in today's dollars. (Note: By count of the coins discovered and those brought on board just in crates, only twenty percent of the gold, at best, was discovered. Not including the large Dobler safe, this translates into a $40 million valuation of gold on board by itself. When including the safe, estimates are even higher, including one of $108 million.) Divers and ships began searching for the sunken treasure two weeks after the disaster, but despite the attempts of numerous people, for over 125 years, the ship's treasure of gold and artifacts were not found, although a fisherman in the 1930s claimed to have found 22 pounds (10 kg) of gold bars from the wreck in his nets. As it was illegal to own gold bars at the time due to Executive Order 6102, he kept the discovery a secret until 1974 when he sold them.

== Modern recovery efforts ==
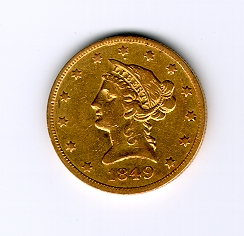
A coin that went down with the ship

Despite the fact that Brother Jonathan sank just 8 miles (13 km) from Crescent City, the storms, rocky passageways, underwater currents, and underwater darkness prevented it from being found. Technology needed to improve and explorers had to change their assumptions before the ship could be found. On the last day of their 1993 expedition, men involved with Deep Sea Research (DSR) decided that the ship had drifted underwater to hit bottom 2 miles (3 km) from where it smashed into the rock. Led by Donald Knight (whose father had found a piece of the wreckage), and under risky conditions, a mini-sub discovered the ship in the predicted location on October 1, 1993. Over time, the team began to bring artifacts back from a depth of 275 feet (84 m).

In 1996, a mini-sub passed a "glint" on the bottom, raising curiosity. On August 30, 1996, divers found 875 gold coins from the 1860s in near-mint condition. Over time, the salvors recovered 1,207 gold coins, primarily $20 double eagles.

Among the thousands of other items eventually raised were 19th-century cut-crystal sherry glasses, white porcelain plates, beer mugs, terracotta containers (once holding mineral water from Germany), glassware, cups, glass containers, multi-faceted cruet bottles, wine and champagne bottles, crates of goods (including axe handles and doorknobs) and tinctures of medicine.

While recovery efforts were being conducted, lawsuits abounded involving the salvors, the State of California, and numismatic experts. California took the legal position that it owned the rights to the wreck and everything located close to its shores. As the state had enacted a broad law granting it these rights to "historical shipwrecks", it fought the salvor's claims of ownership. Although every judge along the way disagreed with California's position, a number of states with similar interests joined in the legal battle. Finally, the U.S. Supreme Court in 1998 unanimously held that existing federal law held precedence, declared the state's law(s) unconstitutional, and ruled for the salvors. However, California officials told DSR that they would take the fight up again to the Supreme Court on the facts, and the state received 20 percent of the recovered gold in a final settlement, as well as ownership of the wreck itself.

In the first legally-recognized sale of all of the salvors' gold discovered from a sunken treasure ship, more than 500 bidders attended the auction of DSR's gold coins on May 29, 1999, in Los Angeles. The sale of its 1006 coins fetched a total of $6.3 million.

Meanwhile, another debate had broken out over the authenticity of the gold assay bars that were said to have been recovered in the 1930s and were sold in 1974. Numismatic experts disputed the authenticity of the bars, labeling them modern forgeries, in a rare public controversy at the 1999 American Numismatic Association's annual convention. These accusations of forgery also resulted in litigation.

== Legacy ==
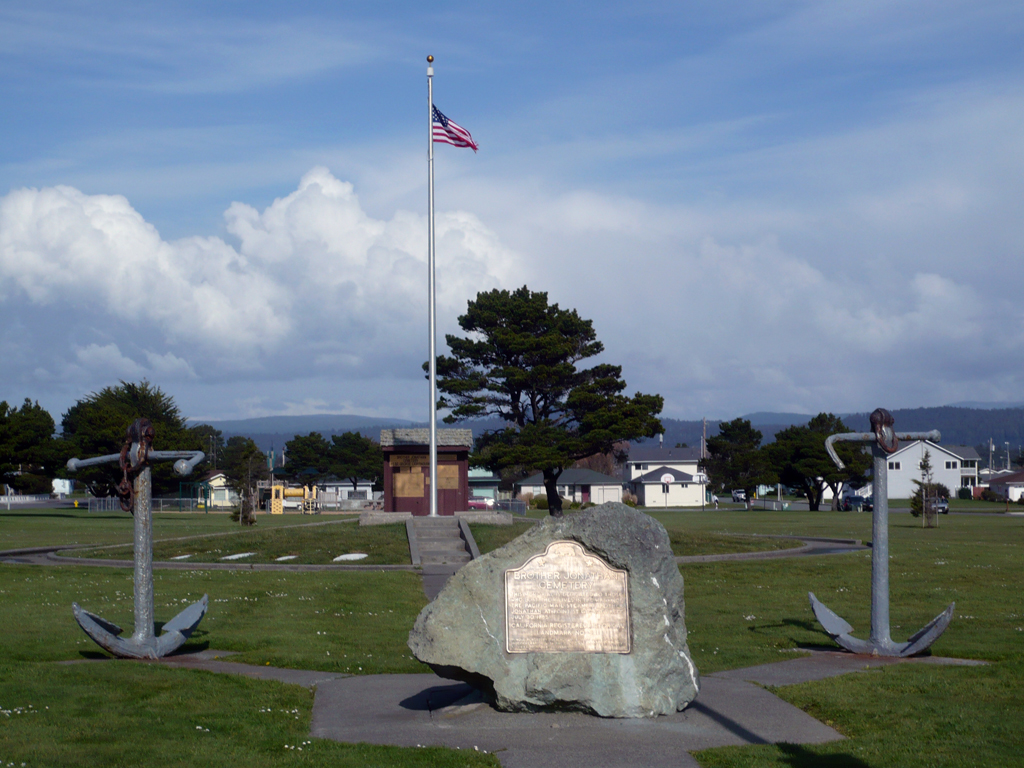
The Brother Jonathan Cemetery and Memorial in Crescent City, California

As a result of the shipwreck, laws were passed to improve passenger-ship safety, including the ability of lifeboats to be launched from a sinking ship.

It also resulted in approval to build the St. George Reef Lighthouse, though construction was not completed until 1892.

A memorial for the deceased, registered as California Historical Landmark No. 541, sits at Brother Jonathan Vista Point in Crescent City. The shipwreck is listed in the National Register of Historic Places. (Note: The listing of the shipwreck in the National Register of Historic Places was part of the litigation efforts by California.)

Deep Sea Research set up a conservation lab for the recovered artifacts that was run by the local historical society in Crescent City, the Del Norte County Historical Society. The salvors also hired national experts including numismatists Robert R. Johnson, Ronald F. Umile, and Konstantin Balter to work with the volunteers in these efforts. This small historical society has been refurbishing and maintaining the artifacts, as well as having an exhibit on Brother Jonathan's demise and a variety of the objects that were reclaimed. The ship's wheel can be found in a restaurant in Portland.

Despite the gold coins already discovered and brought up, crates of gold from Brother Jonathan still remain hidden and undisturbed. The large safe with its millions of dollars of jewels, gold bars, and gold was never found. The salvors estimate that four-fifths of the treasure is still waiting to be discovered—mere miles from land.

On the 150th anniversary of the shipwreck, the Idaho Civil War Round Table held a special commemorative program honoring the victims and survivors of the tragedy where the Brother Jonathan 150th anniversary website was unveiled.

== Bibliography ==
- "Del Norte". California Historical Landmarks. Office of Historic Preservation. Archived from the original on July 30, 2009.
- Bowers, Q. David (1999). The Treasure ship S.S. Brother Jonathan: Her Life and Loss, 1850–1865. Wolfeboro, New Hampshire: Bowers and Merena Galleries, Inc. ISBN 978-0943161815.
- Delgado, James P. (1995). "National Register of Historic Places Registration Form / Brother Jonathan" (PDF). National Park Service.
- DeWolf, Maria (Knight) (March 19, 1900), Handwritten biography and stories on file, Crescent City, California: Del Norte Historical Society
- Emert, Phyllis Raybin (April 1999). "California's Golden Tragedy". East Bay Monthly. Oakland, California.
- Powers, Dennis (2006). Treasure Ship: The Legend and Legacy of the S.S. Brother Jonathan. New York, New York: Kensington/Citadel Press.
- Walker, Goodyear (1999). "We'll Find a New Captain..." (PDF). The Brother Jonathan Shipwreck Exhibit. California State Lands Commission. Archived from the original (PDF) on February 23, 2019.
- United States Printing Office. Acts of Congress Relating to Steamboats. Washington: Government Printing Office, 1867.
