= Mr. James Kent Calhoun House =

Historic house in Illinois, United States

- U.S. National Register of Historic Places
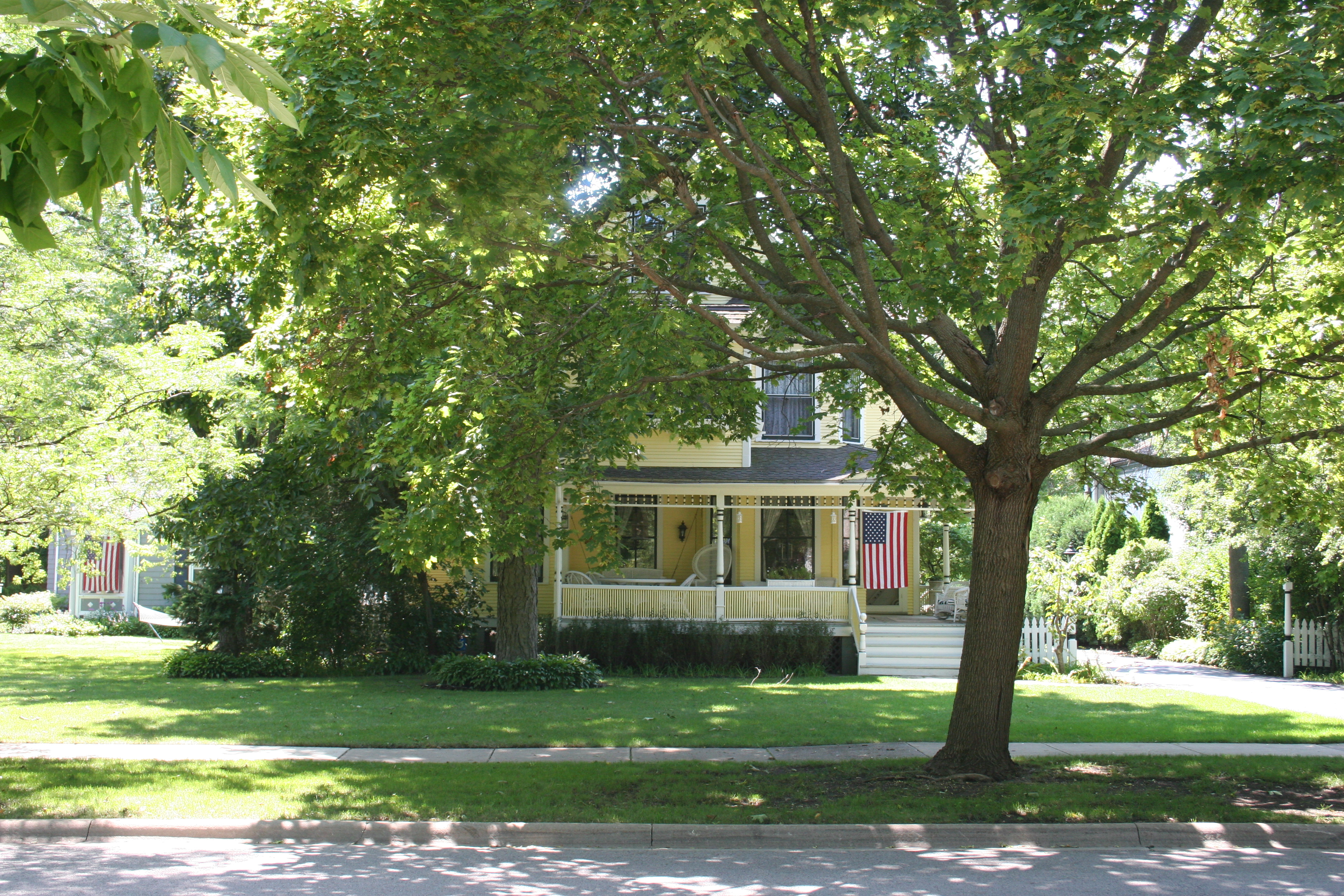

- Location within Chicago metropolitan area Location within Illinois Location within the United States
- Location: 740 Greenwood Ave., Glencoe, Illinois
- Coordinates: 42°08′03″N 87°45′45″W
- Area: less than one acre
- Built: 1895
- Architectural style: Queen Anne
- NRHP reference No.: 09000780
- Added to NRHP: June 7, 2010

The Mr. James Kent Calhoun House is a historic house at 740 Greenwood Avenue in Glencoe, Illinois. The house was built in 1895 for James Kent Calhoun and his family. Calhoun held several positions in Glencoe government, including Village President and Village Trustee, and wrote one of the first chronicles of Glencoe's early history and politics. The house has a Queen Anne style design with a spindlework front porch, bracketed projecting bays, and a cross-gable roof. The Calhoun family has owned the house for all but fifteen of the years since its construction; it was sold after Calhoun's second wife Blanche died in 1975, but his grandson R. Scott Javore bought the house back in 1990.

The house was added to the National Register of Historic Places on June 7, 2010.
