= James D. Calhoun House =

- U.S. National Register of Historic Places
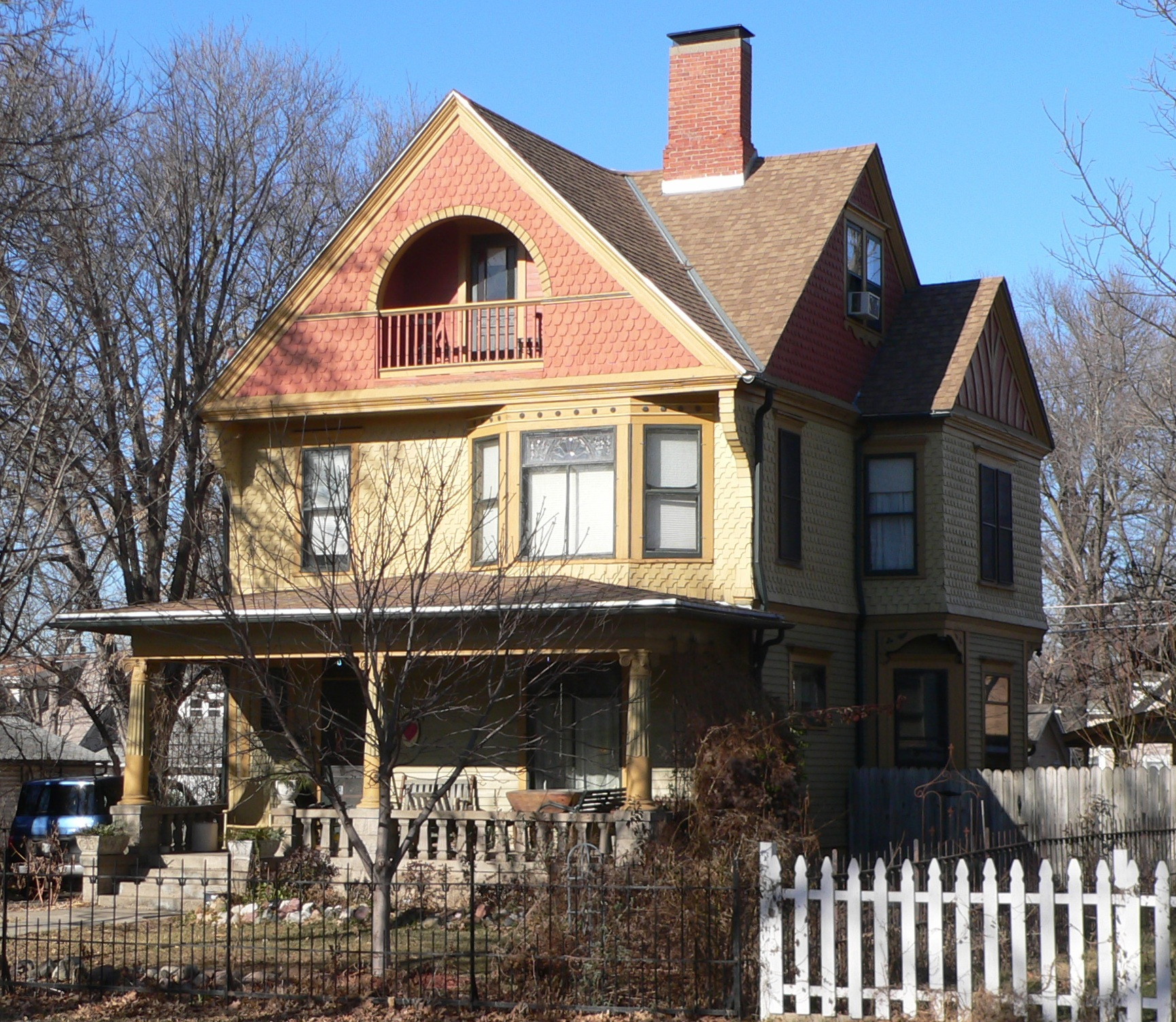
- The house in 2012

- Location within Nebraska Location within the United States
- Location: 1130 Plum Street, Lincoln, Nebraska
- Coordinates: 40°47′31″N 96°42′15″W
- Area: less than one acre
- Built: 1889
- Built by: Charles W. Bean
- Architect: Robert W. Shoppell
- Architectural style: Queen Anne
- NRHP reference No.: 02000411
- Added to NRHP: April 26, 2002

The James D. Calhoun House is a historic house in Lincoln, Nebraska. It was built in 1889 by Charles W. Bean for James D. Calhoun, who served in the Confederate States Army during the American Civil War of 1861-1865 before moving to Nebraska, where he was the editor of the Lincoln Weekly Herald from 1887 to 1894 and the Nebraska State Journal from 1880 to 1886. The house was designed in the Queen Anne style from plans published by architect Robert W. Shoppell. It has been listed on the National Register of Historic Places since April 26, 2002.
