= National Register of Historic Places listings in Josephine County, Oregon =

Location of Josephine County in Oregon

This list presents the full set of buildings, structures, objects, sites, or districts designated on the National Register of Historic Places in Josephine County, Oregon, United States, and offers brief descriptive information about each of them. The National Register recognizes places of national, state, or local historic significance across the United States. Out of over 90,000 National Register sites nationwide, Oregon is home to over 2,000, and 60 of those are found in Josephine County.

This National Park Service list is complete through NPS recent listings posted May 1, 2026.

== Current listings ==
	Name on the Register	Image	Date listed	Location	City or town	Description
1	John and Susanna Ahlf House	John and Susanna Ahlf House	May 9, 1983 (#83002154)	762 NW 6th St. 42°26′44″N 123°19′26″W	Grants Pass	Built in 1902, this is the finest remaining example of the Queen Anne style in Grants Pass, and was the most prominent home in the city prior to World War I. It was built for John Ahlf (1856–1932), a German immigrant and meat packer who became one of the leading businessmen of the Rogue Valley.
2	Allen Gulch Mill		October 4, 2001 (#01001148)	approx. 1 mi. SE of Jct. of Waldo Rd. and Waldo Lookout Rd. 42°03′00″N 123°38′16″W	Cave Junction vicinity	
3	Allen Gulch Townsite		October 4, 2001 (#01001136)	Approx. 1 mi. SE. of Jct. of Waldo Rd. and Waldo Lookout Rd. 42°02′50″N 123°37′55″W	Cave Junction vicinity	
4	George Calhoun House	George Calhoun House	December 2, 1981 (#81000495)	612 NW 5th St. 42°26′38″N 123°19′34″W	Grants Pass	
5	Cameron Mine		October 4, 2001 (#01001144)	Approx. 2 mi. S. of Jct. of Waldo Rd. and Waldo Lookout Rd. 42°02′29″N 123°38′15″W	Cave Junction vicinity	
6	Cedar Guard Station No. 1019	Cedar Guard Station No. 1019	April 8, 1986 (#86000837)	Oregon Route 46, Rogue River – Siskiyou National Forest; 42°08′26″N 123°27′24″W	Cave Junction	
7	Clark–McConnell House	Clark–McConnell House	June 3, 1998 (#98000628)	961 SE 8th St. 42°25′52″N 123°19′43″W	Grants Pass	
8	Clark–Norton House	Clark–Norton House	February 27, 1986 (#86000290)	127 NW D St. 42°26′29″N 123°19′36″W	Grants Pass	
9	Michael Clemens House	Michael Clemens House	April 29, 1982 (#82003728)	612 NW 3rd St. 42°26′41″N 123°19′43″W	Grants Pass	
10	Albert B. and Mary Cornell House	Albert B. and Mary Cornell House	October 31, 2002 (#02001279)	121 NE B St. 42°26′33″N 123°19′28″W	Grants Pass	
11	Thomas Croxton House	Thomas Croxton House	March 29, 1979 (#79002076)	1002 NW Washington Blvd. 42°26′53″N 123°19′32″W	Grants Pass	
12	Deep Gravel Mine		October 4, 2001 (#01001141)	Approx. 1 mile (1.6 km) north of the junction of Waldo Rd. and BLM Rd. 40-8-28; 42°04′07″N 123°38′43″W	Cave Junction vicinity	
13	Dimmick–Judson House	Dimmick–Judson House	June 3, 1998 (#98000629)	906 NE 8th St. 42°26′47″N 123°19′13″W	Grants Pass	
14	Esterly Pit #2 / Llano de Oro Mine		October 4, 2001 (#01001145)	Approx. 1.5 miles (2.4 km) north of the junction of Waldo Rd. and BLM Rd. 40-8-28; 42°04′24″N 123°38′16″W	Cave Junction vicinity	
15	Joseph Fetzner House	Joseph Fetzner House	October 25, 1990 (#90001595)	314 NE. Fetzner St. 42°26′49″N 123°19′08″W	Grants Pass	
16	Dr. William H. Flanagan House	Dr. William H. Flanagan House	May 9, 1983 (#83002155)	720 NW 6th St. 42°26′40″N 123°19′27″W	Grants Pass	
17	Fry Gulch Mine	Fry Gulch Mine	October 4, 2001 (#01001143)	Approx. 0.75 miles (1.21 km) from the junction of Waldo Rd. and BLM Rd. 40-8-28; 42°03′06″N 123°39′10″W	Cave Junction vicinity	
18	Golden Historic District	Golden Historic District	July 25, 2002 (#02000825)	3482 Coyote Creek Rd. 42°40′55″N 123°20′09″W	Wolf Creek	
19	Grants Pass City Hall and Fire Station	Grants Pass City Hall and Fire Station	September 7, 1984 (#84003017)	4th and H Sts. 42°26′21″N 123°19′48″W	Grants Pass	
20	Grants Pass G Street Historic District	Grants Pass G Street Historic District	October 7, 1993 (#93001030)	Bounded by SW G and H Sts. and 4th and 6th Sts. 42°26′20″N 123°19′43″W	Grants Pass	
21	Grants Pass Supervisor's Warehouse	Grants Pass Supervisor's Warehouse	March 6, 1991 (#91000163)	1012 SW L St. 42°26′14″N 123°20′20″W	Grants Pass	
22	Grave Creek Bridge	Grave Creek Bridge	November 29, 1979 (#79002077)	N of Grants Pass; 42°38′10″N 123°22′39″W	Sunny Valley	
23	High Gravel Mine	High Gravel Mine	October 4, 2001 (#01001142)	Approx. 1.3 miles (2.1 km) south of the junction of Waldo Rd. and Waldo Lookout Rd. 42°02′54″N 123°38′37″W	Cave Junction vicinity	
24	Hotel Josephine Annex	Hotel Josephine Annex	February 21, 1997 (#97000133)	118 NW E St. 42°26′28″N 123°19′36″W	Grants Pass	
25	Hugo Community Baptist Church	Hugo Community Baptist Church	October 25, 1990 (#90001587)	6501 Hugo Rd. 42°35′05″N 123°24′07″W	Grants Pass vicinity	
26	Kienlen–Harbeck Building	Kienlen–Harbeck Building	May 13, 1982 (#82003729)	147 SW G St. 42°26′21″N 123°19′42″W	Grants Pass	
27	William J. and Sarah Wagner Lippincott House	William J. and Sarah Wagner Lippincott House	May 18, 2015 (#15000239)	14601 Watergap Road; 42°16′26″N 123°15′41″W	Williams vicinity	
28	Logan Cut		October 4, 2001 (#01001154)	Historic channel of Logan Cut; 42°06′17″N 123°38′30″W	Cave Junction vicinity	
29	Logan Drain Ditches	Logan Drain Ditches	October 4, 2001 (#01001155)	Approx. 2 miles (3.2 km) north of the junction of Waldo Rd. and BLM Rd. 40-8-28; 42°04′48″N 123°37′43″W	Cave Junction vicinity	
30	Logan Wash Ditch	Logan Wash Ditch	October 4, 2001 (#01001153)	Historic Channel of Logan Wash Ditch; 42°04′02″N 123°37′06″W	Cave Junction vicinity	
31	George H. Lundburg House	George H. Lundburg House	March 6, 1987 (#87000365)	404 NW A St. 42°26′42″N 123°19′42″W	Grants Pass	
32	Robert and Lucy McLean House	Robert and Lucy McLean House	April 5, 1984 (#84003020)	724 NW 4th St. 42°26′43″N 123°19′36″W	Grants Pass	
33	Middle Ditch	Middle Ditch	October 4, 2001 (#01001150)	Historic channel of the Logan/Esterly Middle Ditch; 42°03′53″N 123°37′53″W	Cave Junction vicinity	
34	William and Nannie Naucke House	William and Nannie Naucke House	August 5, 1999 (#99000946)	24195 Redwood Highway; 42°11′50″N 123°39′02″W	Kerby	
35	Edwin Newell House	Edwin Newell House	November 15, 1979 (#79002078)	591 SW G St. 42°26′25″N 123°20′05″W	Grants Pass	
36	Newman United Methodist Church	Newman United Methodist Church	December 23, 1977 (#77001103)	128 NE B St. 42°26′35″N 123°19′28″W	Grants Pass	
37	Old Placer Mine		October 4, 2001 (#01001140)	Approximately .65 miles (1.05 km) west of the junction of Rockydale Road and BLM Road 40-8-15; 42°05′35″N 123°38′02″W	Cave Junction vicinity	
38	Oregon Caves Chateau	Oregon Caves Chateau	May 28, 1987 (#87001346)	Oregon Caves National Monument, 19000 Caves Highway; 42°05′58″N 123°24′27″W	Cave Junction vicinity	
39	Oregon Caves Historic District	Oregon Caves Historic District	February 25, 1992 (#92000058)	Oregon Caves National Monument and Preserve, 19000 Caves Highway; 42°05′58″N 123°24′25″W	Cave Junction vicinity	
40	Osgood Ditch	Osgood Ditch	October 4, 2001 (#01001151)	Historic channel of Osgood Ditch (See also Del Norte County, California.); 42°02′31″N 123°38′17″W	Cave Junction vicinity	
41	Plataurica Mine		October 4, 2001 (#01001146)	Approx. .75 mi. SE. of Jct. of Waldo Rd. and Waldo Lookout Rd. 42°03′10″N 123°38′07″W	Cave Junction vicinity	
42	Rand Ranger Station	Rand Ranger Station	June 10, 1999 (#99000703)	14335 Galice Rd. 42°35′53″N 123°34′59″W	Merlin	
43	Redwoods Hotel	Redwoods Hotel	October 25, 1979 (#79002079)	310 NW 6th St; 42°26′28″N 123°19′34″W	Grants Pass	
44	Reed–Cobb–Bowser House and Barn	Reed–Cobb–Bowser House and Barn	October 30, 2017 (#100001772)	1700 Merlin Rd. 42°30′19″N 123°23′52″W	Merlin	
45	Riverside Park	Riverside Park	October 23, 2020 (#100005722)	304 SE Park St. 42°25′45″N 123°19′42″W	Grants Pass	
47	Rogue Theatre	Rogue Theatre	June 30, 2005 (#05000640)	143 SE H St. 42°26′16″N 123°19′36″W	Grants Pass	
48	St. Patrick's Roman Catholic Cemetery	St. Patrick's Roman Catholic Cemetery	October 4, 2001 (#01001137)	Approx. 1 mile (1.6 km) southeast of the junction of Waldo Rd. and Waldo Lookout Rd. 42°03′05″N 123°38′09″W	Cave Junction vicinity	
49	Claus and Hannchen Schmidt House	Claus and Hannchen Schmidt House	January 21, 2004 (#03001478)	508 SW 5th St. 42°26′14″N 123°19′48″W	Grants Pass	
50	Siskiyou Smokejumper Base	Siskiyou Smokejumper Base	November 17, 2006 (#06001035)	Smokejumper Way; 42°06′14″N 123°40′52″W	Cave Junction vicinity	
51	Herbert and Katherine Smith House	Herbert and Katherine Smith House	May 9, 1983 (#83002156)	139 SW I St. 42°26′15″N 123°19′45″W	Grants Pass	
52	Speed's Place on the Rogue		June 21, 1991 (#91000808)	11407 Merlin-Galice Rd. 42°33′53″N 123°35′55″W	Galice	
53	Store Gulch Guard Station No. 1020	Store Gulch Guard Station No. 1020	April 8, 1986 (#86000838)	Illinois Valley Rd., Rogue River – Siskiyou National Forest; 42°17′50″N 123°45′06″W	Cave Junction	
54	Upper Ditch		October 4, 2001 (#01001149)	Historic channel of the Logan/Esterly Upper Ditch (See also Del Norte County, California.); 42°01′10″N 123°38′06″W	Cave Junction vicinity	This ditch, built in 1854 to supply water from the East Fork Illinois River to several hydraulic mines, quickly returned a large profit to its investors. The ditch supplied mines worked by its own owners, as well as providing water for sale to other nearby diggings. It continued in operation until 1942, when the last hydraulic mining operations in the upper Illinois Valley ceased.
55	Amos E. Voorhies House	Amos E. Voorhies House	February 23, 1990 (#90000282)	421 NW B St. 42°26′39″N 123°19′47″W	Grants Pass	Home of newspaper publisher Amos E. Voorhies.
56	Waldo Cemetery	Waldo Cemetery	October 4, 2001 (#01001138)	Approx. 0.5 miles (0.80 km) southwest of the junction of Waldo Rd. and BLM Rd. 40-8-28; 42°03′28″N 123°39′14″W	Cave Junction vicinity	
57	Waldo Chinese Cemetery	Waldo Chinese Cemetery	October 4, 2001 (#01001139)	Approx. 0.5 miles (0.80 km) southwest of the junction of Waldo Rd. and BLM Rd. 40-8-28; 42°03′28″N 123°39′11″W	Cave Junction vicinity	
58	Waldo Mine	Waldo Mine	October 4, 2001 (#01001147)	Southwest of the junction of Waldo Rd. and BLM Rd. 40-8-28; 42°03′32″N 123°38′55″W	Cave Junction vicinity	
59	Whisky Creek Cabin	Whisky Creek Cabin	September 5, 1975 (#75001584)	10 mi. W of Wolf Creek at Rogue River; 42°39′38″N 123°37′59″W	Wolf Creek	
60	Wimer Ditch	Wimer Ditch	October 4, 2001 (#01001152)	Historic Channel of Wimer Ditch; 42°04′01″N 123°38′19″W	Cave Junction vicinity	
61	Wolf Creek Tavern	Wolf Creek Tavern	September 22, 1972 (#72001081)	West side, Old Pacific Highway, OR 99, About .5 mi N of US 5; 42°41′43″N 123°23′46″W	Wolf Creek	

== Former listings ==
	Name on the Register	Image	Date listed	Date removed	Location	City or town	Description
1	Christie–Eismann House		December 2, 1985 (#85003078)	December 7, 1992	5791 Upper River Rd.	Grants Pass vicinity	Destroyed by fire on January 2, 1992.
2	Rogue River Valley Grange No. 469		March 9, 1992 (#92000130)	March 27, 2025	2064 Upper River Rd. 42°26′27″N 123°21′09″W	Grants Pass	Destroyed by fire in June 2012.

== See also ==
- National Register of Historic Places listings in Oregon
- Listings in neighboring counties: Curry, Del Norte, Douglas, Jackson, Siskiyou
- List of National Historic Landmarks in Oregon
- Historic preservation
- History of Oregon
- Lists of Oregon-related topics
