= Osgood Ditch =

- U.S. National Register of Historic Places
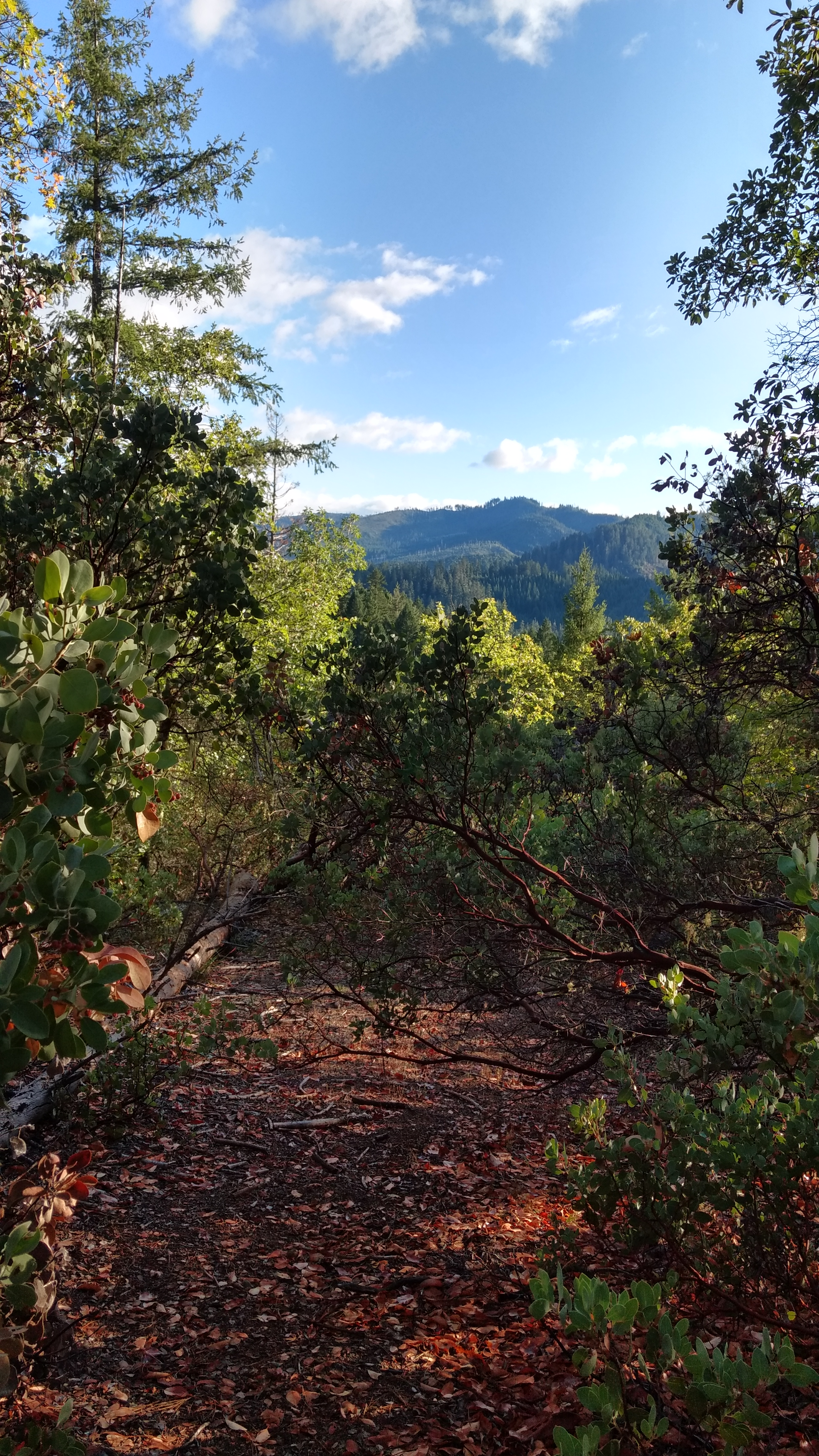

- Location within Oregon Location within the United States
- Nearest city: Cave Junction, Oregon
- Coordinates: 41°57′59″N 123°37′56″W
- Area: 124.4 acres (50.3 ha)
- MPS: Upper Illinois Valley, Oregon Mining Resources MPS
- NRHP reference No.: 01001151
- Added to NRHP: October 4, 2001

The Osgood Ditch is a 9.2-mile (14.8 km) section of mining ditch located in southern Josephine County, Oregon, and northern Del Norte County, California. The ditch supplied water from the East Fork of the Illinois River to the High Gravel and Cameron mines, two hydraulic mines that conducted placer gold mining operations in the Upper Illinois Valley. The ditch was dug around 1900, at the same time that the High Gravel Mine was built. It took its name from F.H. Osgood, who purchased the mine shortly after its construction and expanded the ditch. When the Cameron Mine began hydraulic operations in the 1910s, the ditch brought water to that mine as well. The ditch was last used in 1942, after which point both mines had shut down.

The ditch was added to the National Register of Historic Places on October 4, 2001.

== See also ==
- National Register of Historic Places listings in Josephine County, Oregon
- National Register of Historic Places listings in Del Norte County, California
