= St. George Reef Light =

Lighthouse in California, United States

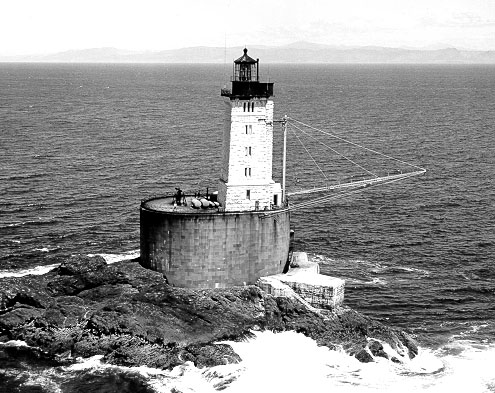
- St. George Reef Light. The manmade granite caisson is five stories high by itself, and waves regularly crash that high. The boom was used to lift supply launches on to the landing platform below.
- Location: Six miles off Point St. George
- Coordinates: 41.83633°N 124.37587°W

Tower
- Constructed: 1881-1890
- Foundation: elliptical concrete and granite basement
- Construction: granite tower
- Height: 90 feet (27 m)
- Shape: square tower with balcony and lantern
- Markings: white tower, black lantern
- Power source: solar power
- Operator: St. George Reef Lighthouse Preservation Society
- Heritage: National Register of Historic Places listed place

Light
- First lit: October 20, 1892
- Deactivated: 1975-2012
- Focal height: 146 feet (45 m)
- Lens: First Order Fresnel lens (removed in 1983 and displayed at Del Norte County Museum)
- Characteristic: Fl W 12s.

U.S. National Register of Historic Places
- Designated: December 9, 1993
- Reference no.: 93001373

The St. George Reef Light is an inactive lighthouse built on North West Seal Rock, six miles (10 km) off the coast of northern California near Crescent City.

== Location ==
The St. George Reef Light is a wave-washed lighthouse, one where the ocean hits from all sides. The location of the light on North West Seal Rock, part of the line of "Dragon Rocks" thus named by Sir Francis Drake, was selected after numerous accidents and the wreck of the overloaded Brother Jonathan on July 30, 1865. The loss of prominent people on the steamer was an impetus to the light's approval; nonetheless, it took until 1892 to complete due to the changing availability of federal construction funds. Unlike the typical lighthouse design by federal architect Ammi B. Young, which consisted of a separate keeper's cottage and light tower, the living quarters and light tower at St. George Reef Light were housed in the same medieval fortress-like structure on top of a 50-foot (15 m) high foundation.

== Construction ==
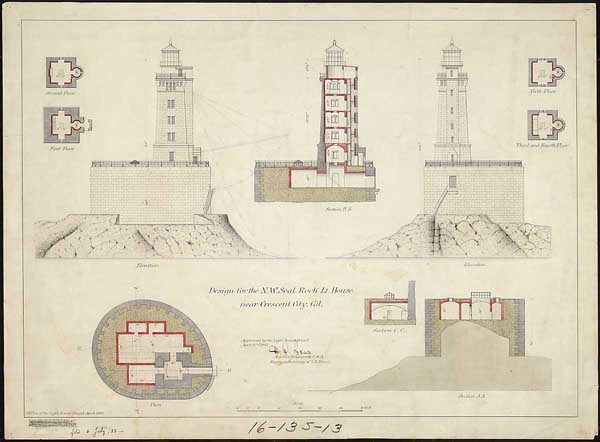
Architect's plans for St. George Reef Lighthouse

The light was first illuminated on October 20, 1892. It stands 144 feet (44 m) above the waterline. The first complete survey of the rock was done in 1882, and construction began in 1883, with the blasting of the reef rock into a stepped pyramid to form the core that anchored the caisson to the rock. The granite was rough quarried at the Mad River quarry and moved by train across the Arcata bottoms. The fully loaded train cars were loaded on barges pulled down the Mad River Slough (not same as the river) and across Humboldt Bay to the construction yard near the Humboldt Bay Life-Saving Station at Paysonville. Trained quarrymen smoothed and shaped the blocks to fit the outlines of templates cut by the designers. Each stone had to fit within tight tolerances to provide a seamless wall against the ocean. Construction was erratic for several years due to lack of funds allotted by Congress. Work was finally completed in 1891, but the lighthouse awaited arrival of its lens from France until the following year. When the light finally became operational in 1892, the total construction expense came to $752,000 (equivalent to $26.3 million today) making it the most expensive lighthouse ever built in the US and more than double the initial estimate.

== Operations ==
Duty at St. George Reef was among the most difficult of any station, due to its remote location and being surrounded by unpredictable, treacherous seas. Several people died during its construction and operation, dozens resigned or sought transfer, and a few even suffered mental breakdowns. Supplies came by launch, and the entire boat was hooked on the large boom and lifted to a boat deck at the base of the caisson. Storms routinely crested over the top deck of the caisson, and in 1952, storm waves even broke the windows in the lantern room 150 feet (46 m) above sea level with seawater streaming down the tower's staircase.

== Termination and preservation efforts ==
The light station was replaced by a "floating lighthouse" buoy and decommissioned in 1975, and its 8-foot (2.4 m)-high first-order Fresnel lens was removed in 1983 for display at the Del Norte County Historical Museum in Crescent City. In 1996, the lighthouse was transferred to the St. George Reef Lighthouse Preservation Society, which conducts ongoing restoration work as well as tours of the site by helicopter from October through June. The lighthouse was relighted on March 10, 2012. The light can be seen from Brookings, Oregon, to Crescent City, California.

After 16 years of safe operation and less than a month after the relighting ceremony, the St. George Reef Lighthouse Preservation Society received a cease-and-desist order from the California State Department of Transportation suspending all helicopter flights, both for maintenance and tourism, to the lighthouse. This was due to a lack of a permit-certified heliport. Tours resumed in 2018 after the construction of a heliport at the base of the tower.

The lighthouse was listed in the National Register of Historic Places, reference number 93001373, on December 9, 1993, and was commemorated on a USPS postage stamp in 2007.

== Historical information from USCG web site ==
This lighthouse, built on a small rock only 300 feet (100 m) in diameter, only 1.6 acres (6,500 m^{2}) in area, is one of the most exposed lighthouses on the Pacific coast. Extreme difficulties were encountered in constructing this tower, and 10 years were required before the work was completed. The base of the tower is a solid block of concrete and granite, and the tower above is also built of granite blocks. The stone was quarried from granite boulders found on Mad River near Humboldt Bay. Probably the most violent storm experienced at this lighthouse was that of 1923, when huge seas from a northwesterly direction broke on the platform of the tower, 70 feet (21 m) above water, with such violence as to tear the donkey-engine house from its foundation. Several men have been injured, and several men killed in transferring to this light by small boat.

St. George Reef Lighthouse represents one of the greatest challenges in U.S. lighthouse building history. Besides being one of the most expensive ever built at that time, it took eight years to complete. Great dressed granite blocks, 1339 of them, from Mad River, were used in construction. In 1892, after a cost of $752,000, the light went into service. It marks the site of the tragic sinking of the steamer Brother Jonathan.

There were ever-present hazards to be encountered in the manning of St. George Reef Lighthouse, located on storm-lashed Northwest Seal Rock. A boom lifted supplies and personnel to the lighthouse. The focal point of the light was 144 feet (44 m) above sea level. It is located approximately 12 miles (19 km) northwest of Crescent City Harbor and was manned by a crew of six. A 1,000,000 candela lamp, marker radio beacon, and a two-tone diaphone fog signal was her armament against disaster to shipping. St. George’s light was displayed from one hour before sunset to one hour after sunrise.

== See also ==
- List of lighthouses in the United States
- National Register of Historic Places listings in Del Norte County, California
