= Rekwoi, California =

Rekwoi Rekʼwoy (Yurok)
- Former settlement
- Location in California
- Coordinates: 41°32′29″N 124°03′04″W
- Country: United States
- State: California
- County: Del Norte County
- Elevation: 9.8 ft (3 m)

Rekwoi (Yurok: Rekʼwoy) is a former Yurok settlement in Del Norte County, California, 1 mi (1.6 km) upstream from Requa. It lies at an elevation of 10 feet (3 m). When occupied, it comprised roughly 25 houses and 15 sweathouses and in 1852, the population was reported to be 116 people. As a result of the Klamath River Wars, many members of the Yurok tribe were massacred and the remaining were sent to Hoopa Valley Indian Reservation
