= Radar Station B-71 =

- U.S. National Register of Historic Places
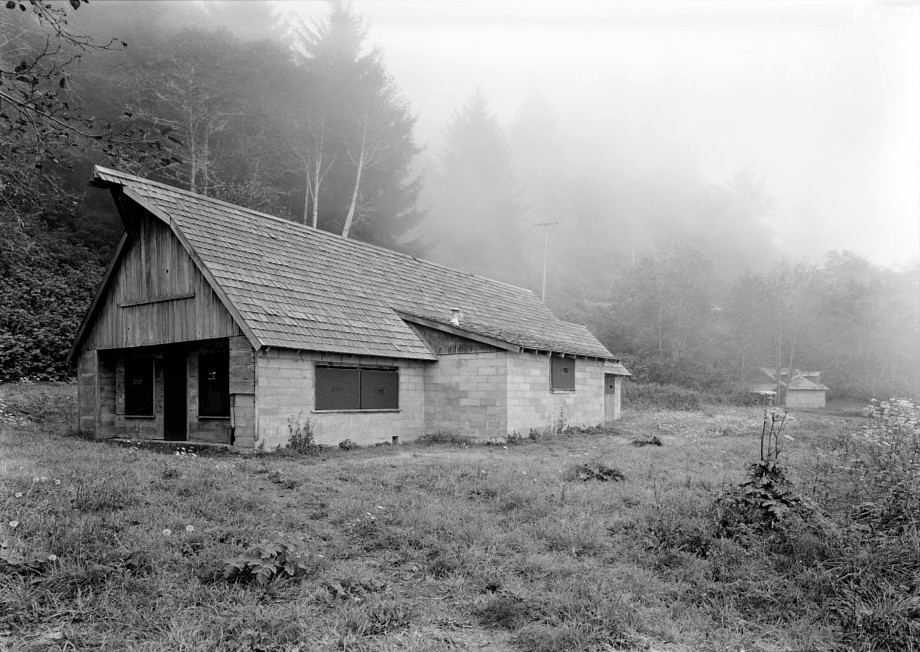
- Radar Station B-71
- Nearest city: Klamath, California
- Coordinates: 41°31′18″N 124°04′51″W
- NRHP reference No.: 78000282
- Added to NRHP: April 19, 1978

The B-71 radar station also known as Klamath River Radar Station, Crescent City Radar Station, and Trinidad Radar Station, was an Army Air Force early warning station in World War II. It is a rare survivor of a World War II early-warning radar station. It was disguised to look like a farmhouse. To guard against potential invasions, the U.S. Army built "farm" buildings; the cinderblock structures, complete with shingled roofs, and fake windows and dormers, housed an early-warning radar station. From the air, the sea, and even the road, these buildings appeared to be part of a working farm. In fact, they housed a diesel generator, electronic equipment, and two 50-caliber anti-aircraft guns. This is one of 65 that were built all along the western coast of America during World War II. It is located on Coastal Dr. just south of the mouth of Klamath River.

== See also ==
- National Register of Historic Places listings in Del Norte County, California
