= North Fork Smith River (California) =

- Location of the mouth of the North Fork Smith River in California

Location
- Country: United States
- State: Oregon, California
- County: Curry County, Oregon, Del Norte County, California

Physical characteristics
- Source: Klamath Mountains
  - location: Chetco Peak, Kalmiopsis Wilderness, Curry County, Oregon
  - coordinates: 42°08′16″N 123°56′49″W
  - elevation: 3,879 ft (1,182 m)
- Mouth: Smith River
  - location: Gasquet, Del Norte County, California
  - coordinates: 41°50′52″N 123°58′08″W
  - elevation: 315 ft (96 m)
- Length: 28 mi (45 km)
- Basin size: 158 sq mi (410 km^{2})
- Discharge
  - average: 942 cu ft/s (26.7 m^{3}/s)

National Wild and Scenic River
- Type: Wild, Scenic
- Designated: October 28, 1988

The North Fork Smith River is 28-mile (45 km) tributary of the Smith River that begins in the U.S. state of Oregon and ends in the U.S. state of California. Arising near Chetco Peak in the Klamath Mountains, it flows generally south to meet the Middle Fork Smith River at Gasquet, California. The combined streams form the Smith River.

== Wild and scenic ==
The entire 13 miles (21 km) of the river that lie within Oregon are part of the National Wild and Scenic Rivers System. In 1988, 8.5 miles (13.7 km) was designated "wild" in two separate segments, from the headwaters to Horse Creek and from Baldface Creek to the Oregon–California border. The 4.5-mile (7.2 km) stretch between Horse and Baldface creeks was classified "scenic".

== Recreation ==
Hiking trails near the North Fork include North Fork Trail, which follows a ridge along the southeast edge of the Kalmiopsis Wilderness in the Rogue River – Siskiyou National Forest in Oregon. Suitable for hikers and horseback riders, the 12.4-mile (20.0 km) trail passes through the area of the Biscuit Fire.

Connected to the North Fork Trail is the Baldface Trail, which crosses Baldface Creek, a North Fork tributary. The 6.8-mile (10.9 km) trail, which also passes through the Biscuit Fire area, is suitable for day hiking but not for horse riding.

The North Fork Trail also connects to the Kalmiopsis Rim Trail, which links to a large network of trails in and near the wilderness and other parts of the national forest. The Rim Trail alone is 28.4 miles (45.7 km) long.

Sourdough Campground, undeveloped but open to dispersed camping in a meadow along the river, lies near the confluence of the North Fork with Baldface Creek in Oregon. Further downstream, North Fork Campground is about 0.25 miles (0.40 km) from the lower river on the California side of the border in Six Rivers National Forest. The remote campground, open all year, has five sites for tent or trailer camping, picnic tables, fire rings, a vault toilet, and limited parking, but no drinking water or garbage pickup.

Lightly used by whitewater enthusiasts because it is difficult, remote, and often of insufficient flow for boating, the river is sometimes run for its lower 13 miles (21 km) in rafts or kayaks. This segment, all within California, is rated Class III (intermediate) and IV (advanced) on the International Scale of River Difficulty.

== Water quality ==
The North Fork's water is of outstanding quality, with low turbidity and almost no pollution. Little logging or road building has occurred in its watershed, and silting after storms is not a problem. However, a proposed nickel mine along Baldface Creek threatens to pollute the river and damage its anadromous fish habitat as well as that of the main stem Smith River. In 2012, the Red Flat Nickel Corporation asked permission from the United States Forest Service to allow exploratory mining along the creek. Many local, state, and tribal agencies as well as environmental, fishing, and recreational organizations strongly oppose mining in the watershed.

== Tributaries ==
Named tributaries of the North Fork Smith River from source to mouth are Horse, Chrome, and Hardrock creeks. Then comes Packsaddle Gulch, Baldface, Fall, and Cedar creeks, followed by Diamond, Still, and Stony creeks.

== See also ==
- List of rivers of Oregon
