= Khoonkhwuttunne, California =

Khoonkhwuttunne
- Former settlement
- Location in California
- Coordinates: 41°56′54″N 124°12′11″W
- Country: United States
- State: California
- County: Del Norte County
- Elevation: 33 ft (10 m)

Khoonkhwuttunne (also, Qo-on-qwut-tunne) is a former Tolowa settlement in Del Norte County, California, United States, located at the mouth of the Smith River. It lay at an elevation of 33 feet (10 m).
