= Adams Station, California =

Unincorporated community in California, United States

Adams Station
- Unincorporated community
- Location in California Adams Station (the United States)
- Coordinates: 41°50′33″N 123°59′33″W
- Country: United States
- State: California
- County: Del Norte
- Elevation: 338 ft (103 m)

Adams Station was a stagecoach stop and hotel in Del Norte County, California, United States. It was located on the Smith River just west of Gasquet, at an elevation of 338 feet (103 m).

The place is named for Mary Adams Peacock, who established Adams Station in 1898. Mrs. Peacock was a stagecoach driver and proprietress of a tavern in the area at the time..
