= Adams Station =

Adams Station may refer to:

- Adams Station, California
- Adams Station, former name of Adams, Tennessee
- Adams station (New York Central Railroad), a disused train station in Adams, Massachusetts
- Adams station (Wisconsin), a station on the Chicago & North Western Railway line between Milwaukee and Wyeville in Adams, Wisconsin
