= Last Chance Grade =

Highway grade in Del Norte County, California

U.S. Route 101
- Last Chance Grade

Route information
- Maintained by Caltrans
- Length: 3 mi (4.8 km)
- Existed: 1937–present

Location
- Country: United States
- State: California
- County: Del Norte

Highway system
- United States Numbered Highway System; List; Special; Divided; State highways in California; Interstate; US; State; Scenic; History; Pre‑1964; Unconstructed; Deleted; Freeways

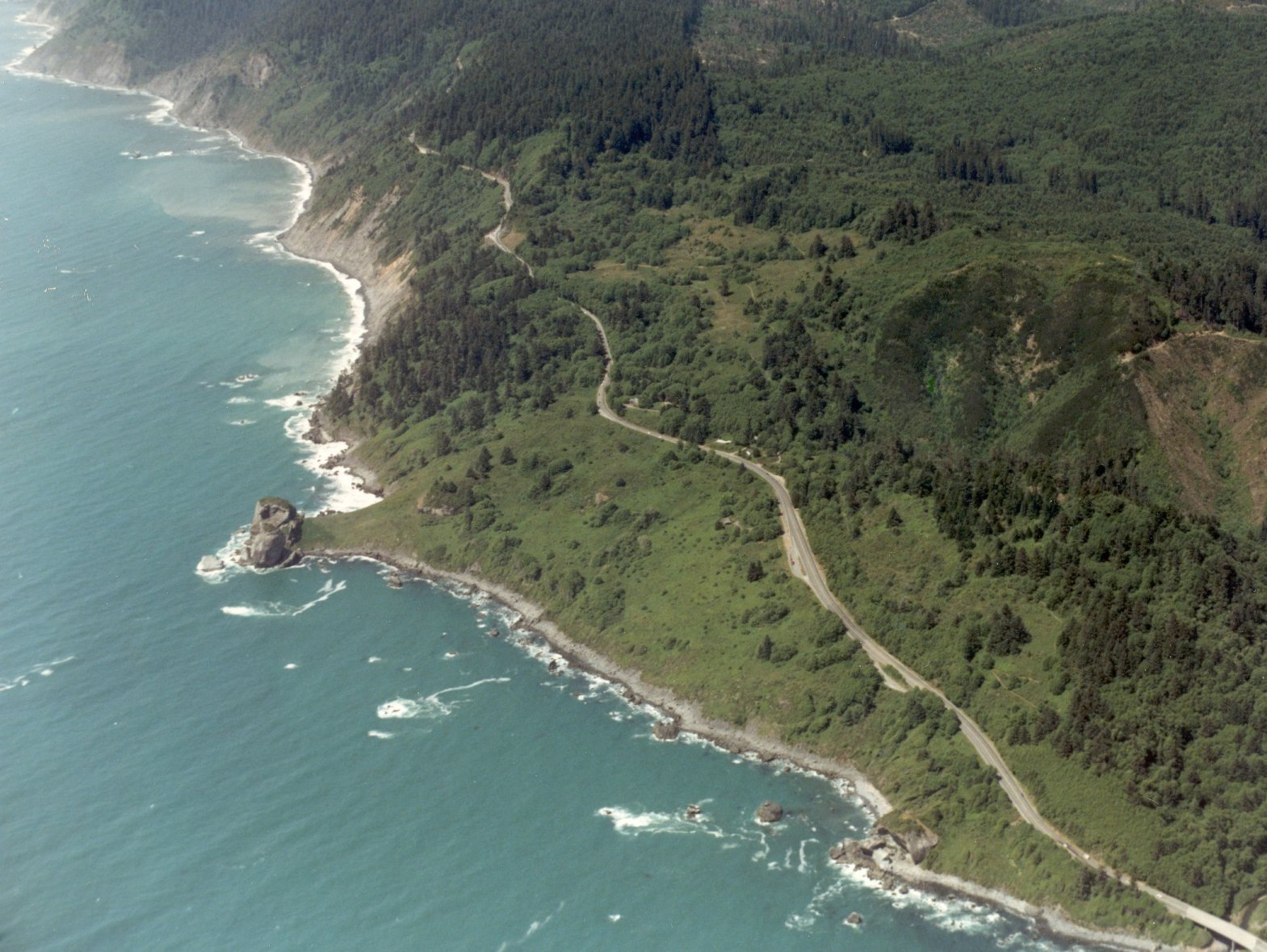
Aerial view of Last Chance Grade

Last Chance Grade is a section of U.S. Route 101 (US 101) in Del Norte County, California, built upon heavily shifting ground. As a result, it is prone to landslides and collpases, making it dangerous to drive and requiring extensive maintenance to keep open. In 2024, the California Department of Transportation (Caltrans) proposed a 6,000-foot (1,800 m) tunnel to bypass the entire section.

== Route description ==
Last Chance Drive is located on US 101 north of Klamath and south of Crescent City in Del Norte County, California. The route, which travels for 3 miles (4.8 km) along the north coast through Redwood National and State Parks, is lined with Redwood trees, offers sweeping views of the Pacific Ocean, and reduces the drive distance between Klamath and Crescent City by 449 miles (723 km). It is also the only route that links Crescent City with nearby Humboldt County, and the route connects critical infrastructure, such as hospitals and schools, in the area. Daily traffic on the route is approximately 6000 vehicles and includes semi-trailers.

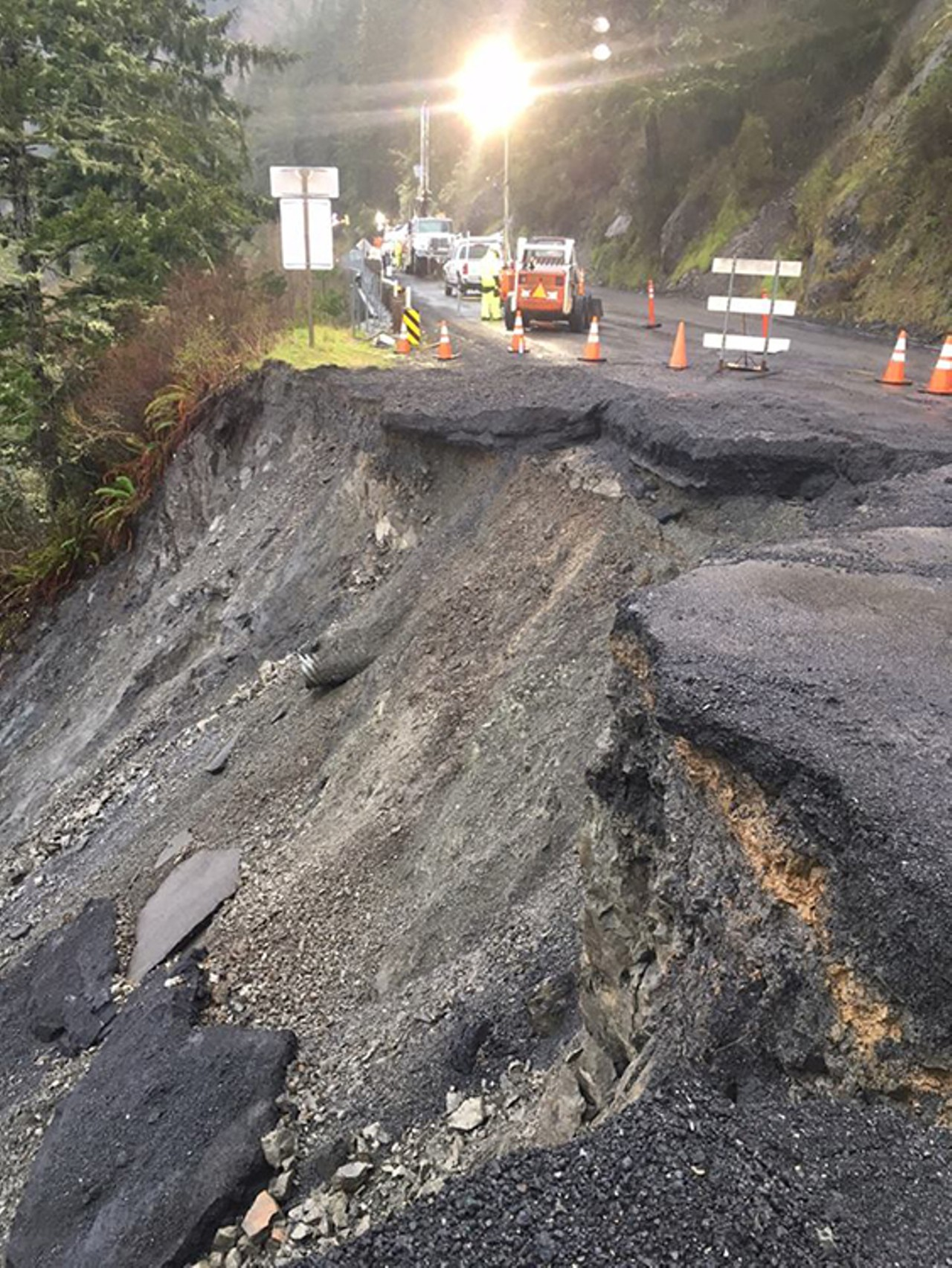
Last Chance Grade landslide and collapse in 2020

A portion of Last Chance Grade is built on earthflow that shifts about two inches (5.1 cm) per year. Another portion is built on fractured sandstone. The area is also near the Cascadia Subduction Zone. As a result, the road is prone to collapses, landslides, rock slides, and other ground failures. According to Caltrans, the route experiences an average of one to three landslides per decade.

== History ==
Last Chance Grade was first built as a wagon trail in 1894, while its current alignment was completed between 1933 and 1937. Numerous slides and slipouts occurred during construction, with engineers noting that the constant land movement would make the route difficult to maintain. As of 2025, the route had shifted 40 feet (12 m) horizontally and 30 feet (9.1 m) vertically from its 1930s alignment, with the movement accelerating in recent years.

The route was closed to two-way traffic from 2014 to 2023. Additionally, a 2021 landslide completely closed the route for several days. A Caltrans study in 2018 determined that a one-year full closure of the route would devastate the area, resulting in 3,800 lost jobs (the population of the entire county is 27,000) and $456 million (equivalent to $559 million in 2024) in losses to the local economy.

More than two dozen retaining walls have been built in attempts to stabilize the route, but maintenance on these walls alone cost more than $125 million between 1997 and 2025. Additionally, $49 million was spent between 2015 and 2018 (equivalent to $61.5 million in 2024) on lane restoration, storm drain repairs, and retaining wall repairs and construction.

In 2024, Caltrans chose from more than 15 alternatives to re-route US 101 through a 6,000-foot (1,800 m) tunnel under the shifting ground, about 100 to 400 feet (30 to 122 m) beneath the surface. The estimated cost of the tunnel is $2.1 billion. In 2025, $40 million was allocated to jumpstart the design process; the entire design phase is expected to cost $275 million. Additionally, $50 million was secured in 2019 for the project's environmental impact assessment, which was completed in 2023. The rest of the project is unfunded, but even so, construction is scheduled to begin in 2030, which would allow the tunnel to open by 2038.
