= Smith River, California =

US town

Smith River
- Census-Designated Place
- Location in California
- Coordinates: 41°55′41″N 124°08′49″W
- Country: United States
- State: California
- County: Del Norte

Area
  - Total: 4.440 sq mi (11.500 km^{2})
  - Land: 4.426 sq mi (11.462 km^{2})
  - Water: 0.015 sq mi (0.038 km^{2}) 0.33%
- Elevation: 52 ft (16 m)

Population (2020)
  - Total: 906
  - Density: 205/sq mi (79.0/km^{2})
- Time zone: UTC-8 (Pacific (PST))
  - Summer (DST): UTC-7 (PDT)
- ZIP Code: 95567
- Area code(s): 707, 369
- GNIS feature IDs: 1659799; 2611450

Smith River (Tolowa: Kaa-nvsh) is an unincorporated area and census-designated place in Del Norte County, California, United States, located near the Oregon border. Smith River is the headquarters of the Tolowa Dee-niʼ Nation, a federally recognized tribe of Tolowa people. As of the 2020 census, the population was 906. It is bordered by the Smith River National Recreation Area.

== History ==
A post office was opened in 1863. One early settler of Smith River was William Dows Rexford, who moved there with his sons in the early 1870s. Smith River has formerly been known as Smith River Corners, Smith's River Valley, Smiths River, and Smith's River.

== Demographics ==
Historical population
| Census | Pop. | Note | %± |
|---|---|---|---|
| 2010 | 866 | | — |
| 2020 | 906 | | 4.6% |
U.S. Decennial Census; 2010

Smith River first appeared as a census designated place in the 2010 U.S. census.

The 2020 United States census reported that Smith River had a population of 906. The population density was 204.7 inhabitants per square mile (79.0/km^{2}). The racial makeup of Smith River was 496 (54.7%) White, 1 (0.1%) African American, 95 (10.5%) Native American, 0 (0.0%) Asian, 1 (0.1%) Pacific Islander, 177 (19.5%) from other races, and 136 (15.0%) from two or more races. Hispanic or Latino of any race were 338 persons (37.3%).

The whole population lived in households. There were 343 households, out of which 114 (33.2%) had children under the age of 18 living in them, 167 (48.7%) were married-couple households, 17 (5.0%) were cohabiting couple households, 86 (25.1%) had a female householder with no partner present, and 73 (21.3%) had a male householder with no partner present. 103 households (30.0%) were one person, and 37 (10.8%) were one person aged 65 or older. The average household size was 2.64. There were 228 families (66.5% of all households).

The age distribution was 225 people (24.8%) under the age of 18, 68 people (7.5%) aged 18 to 24, 210 people (23.2%) aged 25 to 44, 253 people (27.9%) aged 45 to 64, and 150 people (16.6%) who were 65 years of age or older. The median age was 38.9 years. For every 100 females, there were 105.0 males.

There were 365 housing units at an average density of 82.5 units per square mile (31.9 units/km^{2}), of which 343 (94.0%) were occupied. Of these, 217 (63.3%) were owner-occupied, and 126 (36.7%) were occupied by renters.

== Climate ==
Smith River, California

Climate chart (precipitation, max. and min. temperature)
| J | F | M | A | M | J | J | A | S | O | N | D |
| 11 55 42 | 11 56 42 | 9.6 58 42 | 5.7 60 44 | 3.6 63 47 | 1.8 67 50 | 0.5 68 52 | 1 68 53 | 2 68 51 | 5.2 65 48 | 11 58 45 | 12 56 41 |
- █ Average max. and min. temperatures in °F
- █ Precipitation totals in inches
Metric conversion
| J | F | M | A | M | J | J | A | S | O | N | D |
| 284 13 6 | 267 13 6 | 244 14 6 | 145 16 7 | 91 17 8 | 46 19 10 | 13 20 11 | 25 20 12 | 51 20 11 | 132 18 9 | 269 14 7 | 305 13 5 |
- █ Average max. and min. temperatures in °C
- █ Precipitation totals in mm

Smith River experiences an Oceanic climate and is located slightly north of the boundary of the Mediterranean climate zone of coastal California. Total annual precipitation is among the highest in California. Seasonal precipitation is similar to a Mediterranean climate, although the annual precipitation of 73.73 in (1,873 mm) exceeds the 900 mm (35 in) precipitation limit for Mediterranean climates implemented in the revised version of the Köppen climate classification. The summer months from June to September receive lower precipitation, relative to other months, with July and August in particular being relatively dry. Winter is wet and windy, with approximately 74% of the year's total average precipitation observed in the five-month period from November to March. Temperatures remain moderate throughout the year, fluctuating only several degrees.

Climate data for Smith River, California
| Month | Jan | Feb | Mar | Apr | May | Jun | Jul | Aug | Sep | Oct | Nov | Dec | Year |
|---|---|---|---|---|---|---|---|---|---|---|---|---|---|
| Record high °F (°C) | 80 (27) | 83 (28) | 83 (28) | 92 (33) | 99 (37) | 101 (38) | 102 (39) | 101 (38) | 103 (39) | 96 (36) | 85 (29) | 79 (26) | 103 (39) |
| Mean daily maximum °F (°C) | 55 (13) | 56 (13) | 58 (14) | 60 (16) | 63 (17) | 67 (19) | 68 (20) | 68 (20) | 68 (20) | 65 (18) | 58 (14) | 56 (13) | 62 (17) |
| Daily mean °F (°C) | 48.5 (9.2) | 49 (9) | 50 (10) | 52 (11) | 55 (13) | 58.5 (14.7) | 60 (16) | 60.5 (15.8) | 59.5 (15.3) | 56.5 (13.6) | 51.5 (10.8) | 48.5 (9.2) | 54.1 (12.3) |
| Mean daily minimum °F (°C) | 42 (6) | 42 (6) | 42 (6) | 44 (7) | 47 (8) | 50 (10) | 52 (11) | 53 (12) | 51 (11) | 48 (9) | 45 (7) | 41 (5) | 46 (8) |
| Record low °F (°C) | 21 (−6) | 24 (−4) | 29 (−2) | 31 (−1) | 32 (0) | 37 (3) | 39 (4) | 41 (5) | 39 (4) | 32 (0) | 28 (−2) | 17 (−8) | 17 (−8) |
| Average precipitation inches (mm) | 11.18 (284) | 10.49 (266) | 9.61 (244) | 5.72 (145) | 3.61 (92) | 1.83 (46) | 0.51 (13) | 1.04 (26) | 1.95 (50) | 5.22 (133) | 10.58 (269) | 11.99 (305) | 73.73 (1,873) |
| Average snowfall inches (cm) | 0.2 (0.51) | 0.2 (0.51) | 0.2 (0.51) | 0 (0) | 0 (0) | 0 (0) | 0 (0) | 0 (0) | 0 (0) | 0 (0) | 0.1 (0.25) | 0.3 (0.76) | 1.0 (2.5) |

== Politics ==
In the state legislature, Smith River is in the 2nd senatorial district, represented by Democrat Mike McGuire, and the 2nd Assembly district, represented by Democrat Chris Rogers.

Federally, Smith River is in California's 2nd congressional district, represented by Democrat Jared Huffman.

== In popular culture ==
Smith River was listed as one of the filming sites for the 1983 film Return of the Jedi, alongside Buttercup Valley and Death Valley in the eastern and southeastern portions of the state, respectively.

Smith River is also known as the "Lily Bulb Capital of the World".
