= Bertsch–Oceanview, California =

Census-designated place in Del Norte County, California, United States

Bertsch–Oceanview
- Census-designated place
- Shoreline view in Bertsch–Oceanview, July 2012

- Location in Del Norte County and the state of California

- Location in the United States
- Coordinates: 41°45′09″N 124°09′32″W
- Country: United States
- State: California
- County: Del Norte

Area
  - Total: 5.58 sq mi (14.44 km^{2})
  - Land: 5.30 sq mi (13.73 km^{2})
  - Water: 0.27 sq mi (0.71 km^{2}) 4.76%
- Elevation: 20 ft (6 m)

Population (2020)
  - Total: 2,520
  - Density: 475.4/sq mi (183.57/km^{2})
- Time zone: UTC-08:00 (PST)
  - Summer (DST): UTC-07:00 (PDT)
- ZIP code: 95531
- Area codes: 707, 369
- FIPS code: 06-06150
- GNIS feature ID: 2407832

Bertsch–Oceanview is a census-designated place (CDP) in Del Norte County, California, United States. The community is located east of Crescent City, at an elevation of 20 feet (6.1 m), Bertsch–Oceanview has a total area of 5.9 square miles (15 km^{2}) of which 5.5 square miles (14 km^{2}) is land and 0.3 square miles (0.78 km^{2}) is water. Its population is 2,520 as of the 2020 census, up from 2,436 from the 2010 census. The Elk Valley Rancheria Indian reservation is located within Bertsch–Oceanview.

== Demographics ==
Bertsch–Oceanview first appeared as a census designated place in the 2000 U.S. census.

=== 2020 ===
Bertsch-Oceanview CDP, California – Racial and ethnic composition Note: the US Census treats Hispanic/Latino as an ethnic category. This table excludes Latinos from the racial categories and assigns them to a separate category. Hispanics/Latinos may be of any race.
Race / Ethnicity (NH = Non-Hispanic)	Pop 2000	Pop 2010	Pop 2020	% 2000	% 2010	% 2020
White alone (NH)	1,710	1,671	1,578	76.41%	68.60%	62.62%
Black or African American alone (NH)	18	3	12	0.80%	0.12%	0.48%
Native American or Alaska Native alone (NH)	177	250	324	7.91%	10.26%	12.86%
Asian alone (NH)	55	92	50	2.46%	3.78%	1.98%
Native Hawaiian or Pacific Islander alone (NH)	1	0	3	0.04%	0.00%	0.12%
Other race alone (NH)	3	1	10	0.13%	0.04%	0.40%
Mixed race or Multiracial (NH)	70	109	194	3.13%	4.47%	7.70%
Hispanic or Latino (any race)	204	310	349	9.12%	12.73%	13.85%
Total	2,238	2,436	2,520	100.00%	100.00%	100.00%

Historical population
Census	Pop.	Note	%±
2000	2,238		—
2010	2,436		8.8%
2020	2,520		3.4%
U.S. Decennial Census; 1850–1870 1880-1890; 1900 1910 1920; 1930 1940 1950; 1960 1970 1980; 1990 2000 2010

The 2020 United States census reported that Bertsch-Oceanview had a population of 2,520. The population density was 475.5 inhabitants per square mile (183.6/km^{2}). The racial makeup of Bertsch-Oceanview was 65.6% White, 0.6% African American, 14.2% Native American, 2.0% Asian, 0.2% Pacific Islander, 4.5% from other races, and 12.9% from two or more races. Hispanic or Latino of any race were 13.8% of the population.

The census reported that 99.9% of the population lived in households, 2 people (0.1%) lived in non-institutionalized group quarters, and no one was institutionalized.

There were 913 households, out of which 30.4% included children under the age of 18, 43.2% were married-couple households, 9.4% were cohabiting couple households, 29.8% had a female householder with no partner present, and 17.6% had a male householder with no partner present. 26.0% of households were one person, and 12.4% were one person aged 65 or older. The average household size was 2.76. There were 588 families (64.4% of all households).

The age distribution was 24.2% under the age of 18, 8.0% aged 18 to 24, 23.5% aged 25 to 44, 26.5% aged 45 to 64, and 17.8% who were 65 years of age or older. The median age was 40.0 years. For every 100 females, there were 93.7 males.

There were 1,003 housing units at an average density of 189.2 units per square mile (73.1 units/km^{2}), of which 913 (91.0%) were occupied. Of these, 70.9% were owner-occupied, and 29.1% were occupied by renters.

In 2023, the US Census Bureau estimated that the median household income was $73,229, and the per capita income was $35,489. About 8.0% of families and 8.7% of the population were below the poverty line.

== Climate ==
Climate data for Bertsch–Oceanview, California 92 ft(28 m) (1981-2010)
Month	Jan	Feb	Mar	Apr	May	Jun	Jul	Aug	Sep	Oct	Nov	Dec	Year
Mean daily maximum °F (°C)	53.8 (12.1)	54.8 (12.7)	55.5 (13.1)	56.9 (13.8)	59.6 (15.3)	61.6 (16.4)	63.2 (17.3)	63.8 (17.7)	63.9 (17.7)	61.6 (16.4)	59.7 (15.4)	53.4 (11.9)	59.0 (15.0)
Daily mean °F (°C)	47.8 (8.8)	48.5 (9.2)	49.1 (9.5)	50.4 (10.2)	53.2 (11.8)	55.4 (13.0)	57.3 (14.1)	57.8 (14.3)	56.9 (13.8)	54.5 (12.5)	50.6 (10.3)	47.6 (8.7)	52.4 (11.4)
Mean daily minimum °F (°C)	41.9 (5.5)	42.2 (5.7)	42.7 (5.9)	43.8 (6.6)	46.8 (8.2)	49.2 (9.6)	51.3 (10.7)	51.8 (11.0)	49.9 (9.9)	47.4 (8.6)	44.5 (6.9)	41.7 (5.4)	46.1 (7.8)
Average precipitation inches (mm)	10.45 (265)	9.00 (229)	8.88 (226)	5.56 (141)	3.26 (83)	1.92 (49)	0.36 (9.1)	0.56 (14)	1.11 (28)	4.19 (106)	9.71 (247)	12.70 (323)	67.7 (1,720.1)
Average relative humidity (%)	78.7	78.1	80.0	80.4	80.9	82.9	84.9	84.9	80.6	79.5	79.8	77.8	80.7
Average dew point °F (°C)	41.5 (5.3)	42.0 (5.6)	43.2 (6.2)	44.6 (7.0)	47.5 (8.6)	50.3 (10.2)	52.8 (11.6)	53.3 (11.8)	51.0 (10.6)	48.3 (9.1)	44.6 (7.0)	41.0 (5.0)	46.7 (8.2)

== Politics ==
In the state legislature Bertsch–Oceanview is in the 2nd senatorial district, represented by Democrat Mike McGuire, and in the 2nd Assembly district, represented by Democrat Chris Rogers. Federally, Bertsch–Oceanview is in California's 2nd congressional district, represented by Democrat Jared Huffman.

== See also ==
- List of census-designated places in California
