= Pacific Shores, California =

Unincorporated community in California, United States

Pacific Shores
- Unincorporated community
- Location in California Pacific Shores (the United States)
- Coordinates: 41°51′19″N 124°12′05″W
- Country: United States
- State: California
- County: Del Norte County
- Elevation: 20 ft (6 m)

Pacific Shores is an unincorporated community in Del Norte County, California, United States. The population at the 2010 census was 0 people. It lies at an elevation of 20 feet (6 m). It contains an abundance of streets laid out in more or less a grid. In 1963, the 760-acre area was subdivided into property lots that have been undeveloped since the land became protected by The California Coastal Act of 1976.

== See also ==
- California Coastal Commission
