= Scaath, California =

Scaath Saʼahl (Yurok)
- Unincorporated community
- Map showing Scaath in California
- Coordinates: 41°30′52″N 123°58′10″W
- Country: United States
- Elevation: 79 ft (24 m)
- Time zone: UTC-8 (PST)
  - Summer (DST): UTC-7 (PDT)
- Area code: Area code 707

Scaath (Yurok: Saʼahl) is an unincorporated community in Del Norte County, California, United States.It is located on the north bank of the Klamath River, east of Klamath Glen.

== Geography ==
The coordinates of Scaath are 41°30′52″N 123°58′10″W / 41.51444°N 123.96944°W, the average altitude of the place is 24 meters (79 feet).
