= Smith River National Recreation Area =

National recreation area in California, United States

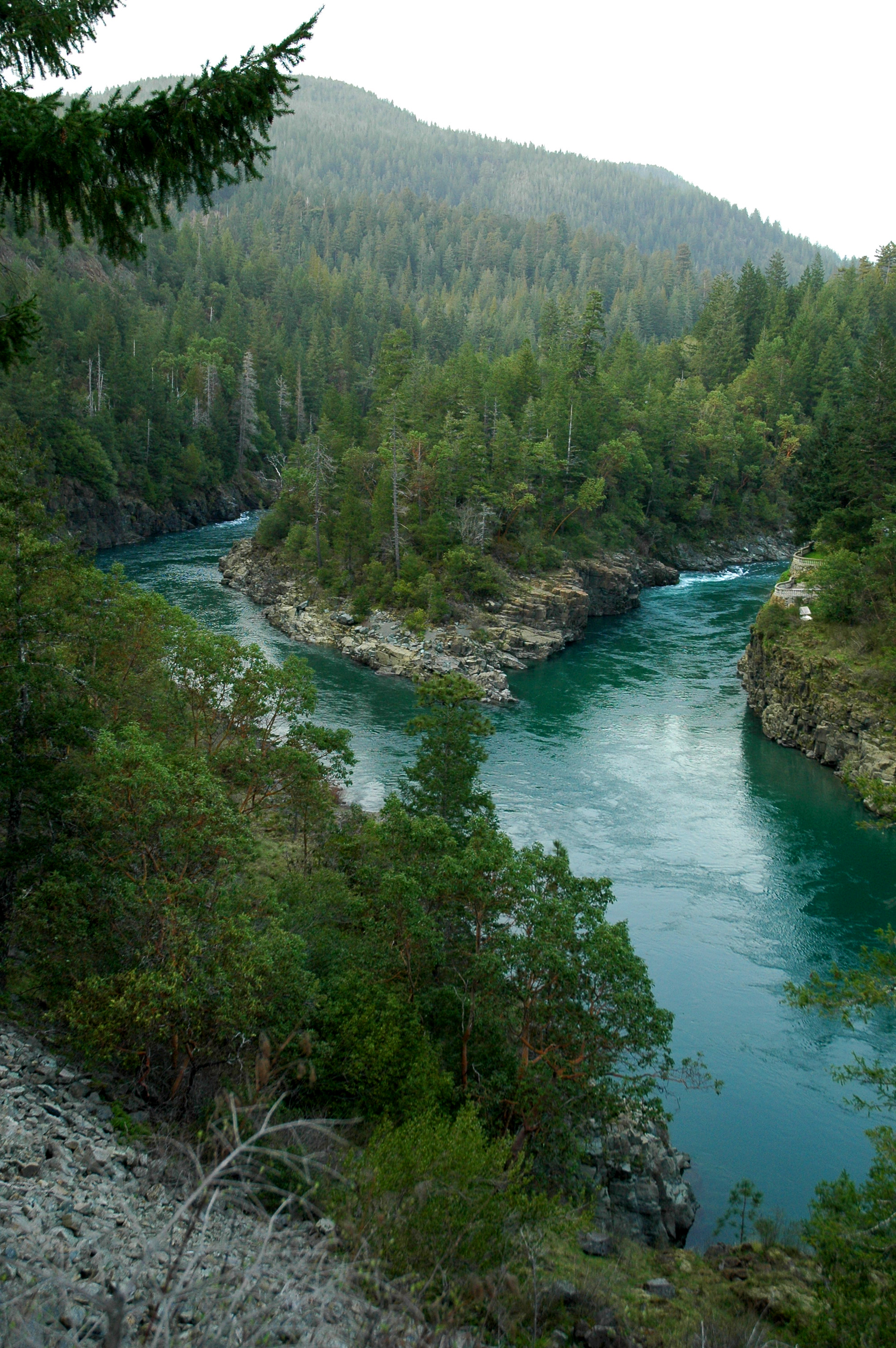

- Location within California Location within the United States
- Interactive map of Smith River National Recreation Area
- Location: Del Norte County, California, United States
- Nearest city: Crescent City, California
- Coordinates: 41°55′00″N 123°52′00″W
- Area: 305,169 acres (1,235 km^{2})
- Established: November 16, 1990
- Governing body: United States Forest Service
- Website: Smith River National Recreation Area

Smith River National Recreation Area is a protected area located in northwestern California, United States. The national recreation area is in Six Rivers National Forest and is managed by the U.S. Forest Service, an agency of the U.S. Department of Agriculture. Created by Congress in 1990, Smith River National Recreation Area meets the northern border of Redwood National and State Parks.

The Klamath Mountains and the Smith River, one of the longest National Wild and Scenic Rivers in the U.S., offer a variety of recreational opportunities. The National Recreation Area has five campgrounds located near major streams and along the Smith River. It is considered one of the best fishing regions in the country, and rafting and canoeing are popular activities. Most hiking trails are accessible year-round, but all activities may be greatly affected by periodic heavy rainfall that swells creeks and rivers.

== Climate ==
The region receives over 90 in (2,300 mm) of rainfall annually, with the greatest amounts in the winter. Summers may be foggy as moisture laden clouds rise up the Coast Range mountains from the Pacific Ocean.

== Ecology ==
Trophy sized steelhead, chinook salmon and other game fish species have led to this area being considered one of the best fishing regions in the United States. Port Orford cedars are native to this area as the tree’s range extends about 50 miles (80 km) inland from the coast around Coos Bay, Oregon, to the mouth of the Mad River near Arcata. To prevent the spread of a root disease caused by the pathogen Phytophthora lateralis, forest roads and campgrounds may be closed during the rainy season when there is the most opportunities for contaminated soil to be spread around. The spores that live in water and wet soil can be introduced by vehicles, animals and people traveling from infected areas.

== Transportation ==
The area is bisected by U.S. Route 199 which is designated the Smith River Scenic Byway. Passing through the community of Hiouchi, Gasquet and Patrick Creek Lodge on the western side of the summit, the National Forest Scenic Byway is part of the California Freeway and Expressway System and is eligible for the State Scenic Highway System. The highway is the northern portion of the Redwood Highway. Formerly signed as California State Route 199, the highway links U.S. Route 101 near Crescent City, California with Interstate 5 in Grants Pass, Oregon, a distance of 80 miles (130 km).
