= Smith River (California) =

River in California, United States

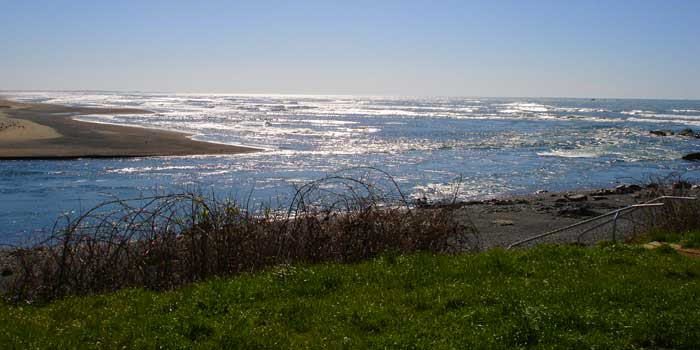
- The mouth of the Smith River as it enters the Pacific Ocean

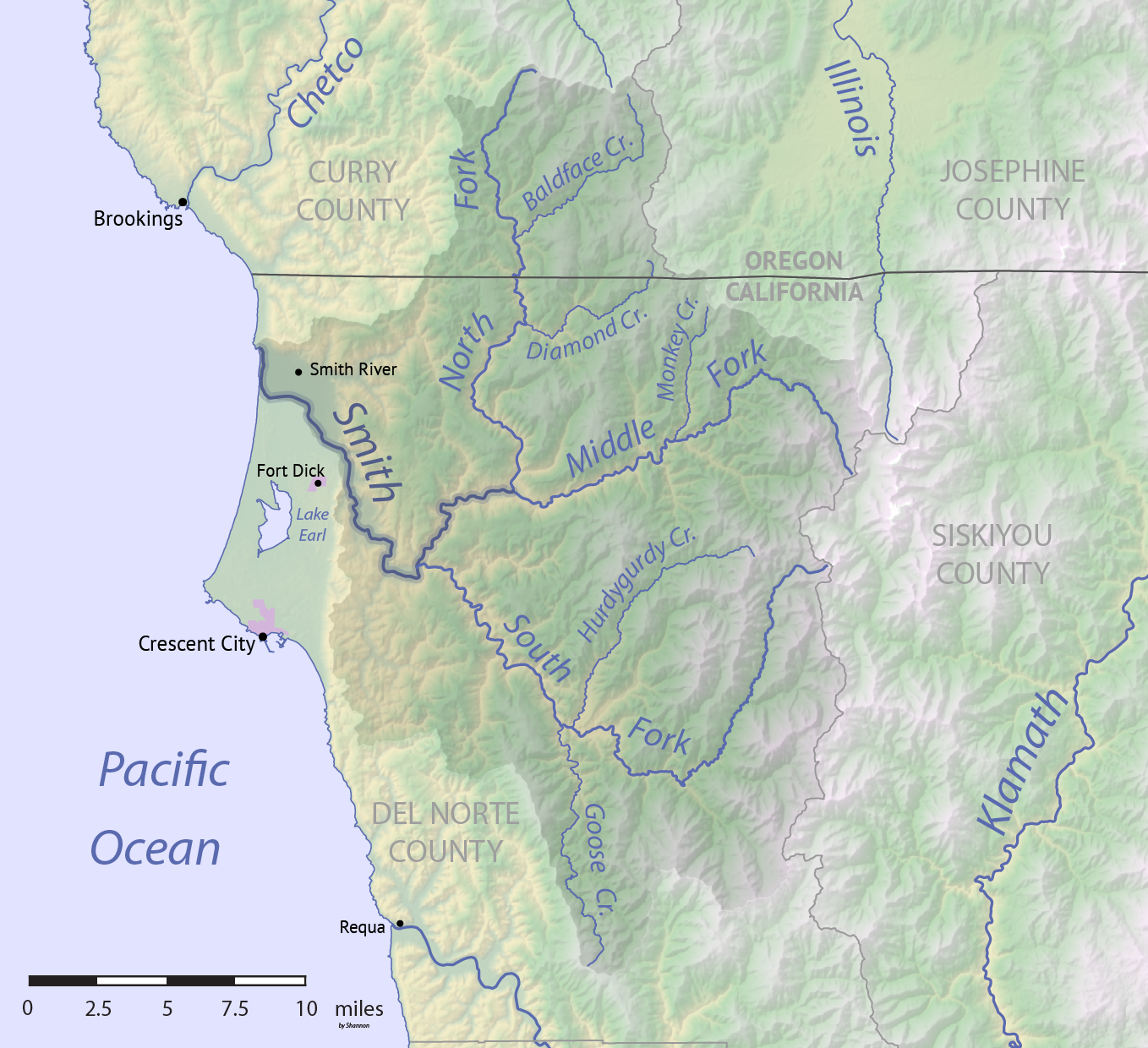
- Map of the Smith River watershed

Location
- Country: United States
- State: California

Physical characteristics
- Source: Confluence of North and Middle Forks
  - location: Gasquet, Klamath Mountains, Six Rivers National Forest, Del Norte County
  - coordinates: 41°50′52″N 123°58′08″W
  - elevation: 315 ft (96 m)
- Mouth: Pacific Ocean
  - location: near community of Smith River, Del Norte County
  - coordinates: 41°56′10″N 124°12′12″W
  - elevation: 0 ft (0 m)
- Length: 25.1 mi (40.4 km)
- Basin size: 719 sq mi (1,860 km^{2})
- Discharge
  - location: about 7 mi (11 km) east of Crescent City
  - average: 3,748 cu ft/s (106.1 m^{3}/s)
  - minimum: 160 cu ft/s (4.5 m^{3}/s)
  - maximum: 228,000 cu ft/s (6,500 m^{3}/s)

Basin features
- Tributaries
  - left: Middle Fork Smith River, South Fork Smith River
  - right: North Fork Smith River

National Wild and Scenic River
- Type: Wild 78.0 miles (125.5 km); Scenic 31.0 miles (49.9 km); Recreational 216.4 miles (348.3 km)
- Designated: January 19, 1981

The Smith River (Tolowa: Xaa-wvn’-taa-ghii~-li~’, Nii~-li~’) flows from the Klamath Mountains to the Pacific Ocean in Del Norte County in extreme northwestern California, on the West Coast of the United States. The river, about 25.1 miles (40.4 km) long, all within Del Norte County, flows through the Rogue River – Siskiyou National Forest, Six Rivers National Forest, and Jedediah Smith Redwoods State Park.

== Course ==
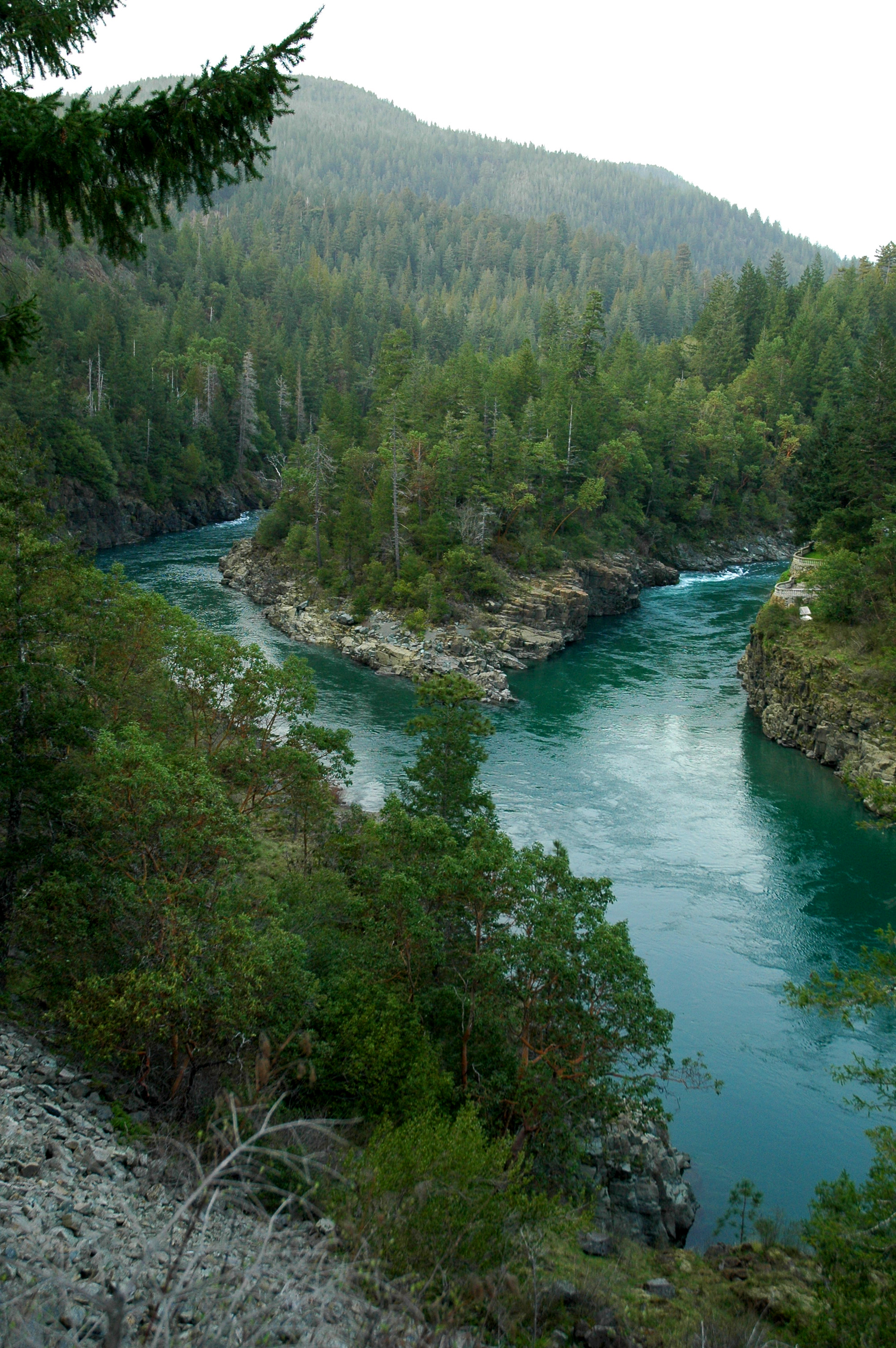
The confluence of the South Fork with the main Smith River near Crescent City, California

The Smith River is formed by the confluence of its Middle Fork and North Fork, near the community of Gasquet. The Middle Fork, 27.8 miles (44.7 km) long, rises in Del Norte County, approximately 60 miles (100 km) northeast of Crescent City, and flows west. The North Fork Smith River, 28.1 miles (45.2 km) long, rises in Oregon on the northeast slope of Chetco Peak. The South Fork Smith River enters the Smith River near the community of Hiouchi. The 43.3-mile-long (69.7 km) fork rises on the eastern edge of the Smith River National Recreation Area, approximately 30 miles (48 km) east-northeast of Crescent City, flowing southwest and then northwest.

From the confluence with the South Fork, the Smith River flows generally northwest, entering the Pacific Ocean near the community of Smith River, approximately 10 miles (16 km) north of Crescent City. Smith River estuary is recognized for protection by the California Bays and Estuaries Policy.

== Watershed ==
The river's watershed catchment area is 719 square miles (1,860 km^{2}). It drains a rugged area of the western Klamath Mountains and Northern Outer California Coast Ranges, west of the Siskiyou Mountains, barely across the Oregon border, and north of the watershed of the Klamath River.

By average discharge, the Smith is the largest river system in California that flows freely along its entire course. The highly variable annual flow is approximately 3,746 cu ft/s (106.1 m^{3}/s), with an average monthly high of 8,432 cu ft/s (238.8 m^{3}/s) in January, and an average low of 336 cu ft/s (9.5 m^{3}/s) in September. The all-time highest flow was 228,000 cubic feet per second (6,500 m^{3}/s) on December 22, 1964, during the Christmas flood of 1964.

The river was named for the explorer Jedediah Smith.

== Conservation ==
The free-flowing nature of the river—without a single dam along its entire length—makes it especially prized among conservationists and is considered one of the crown jewels of the National Wild and Scenic River program. It is the only major California river never to have been dammed.

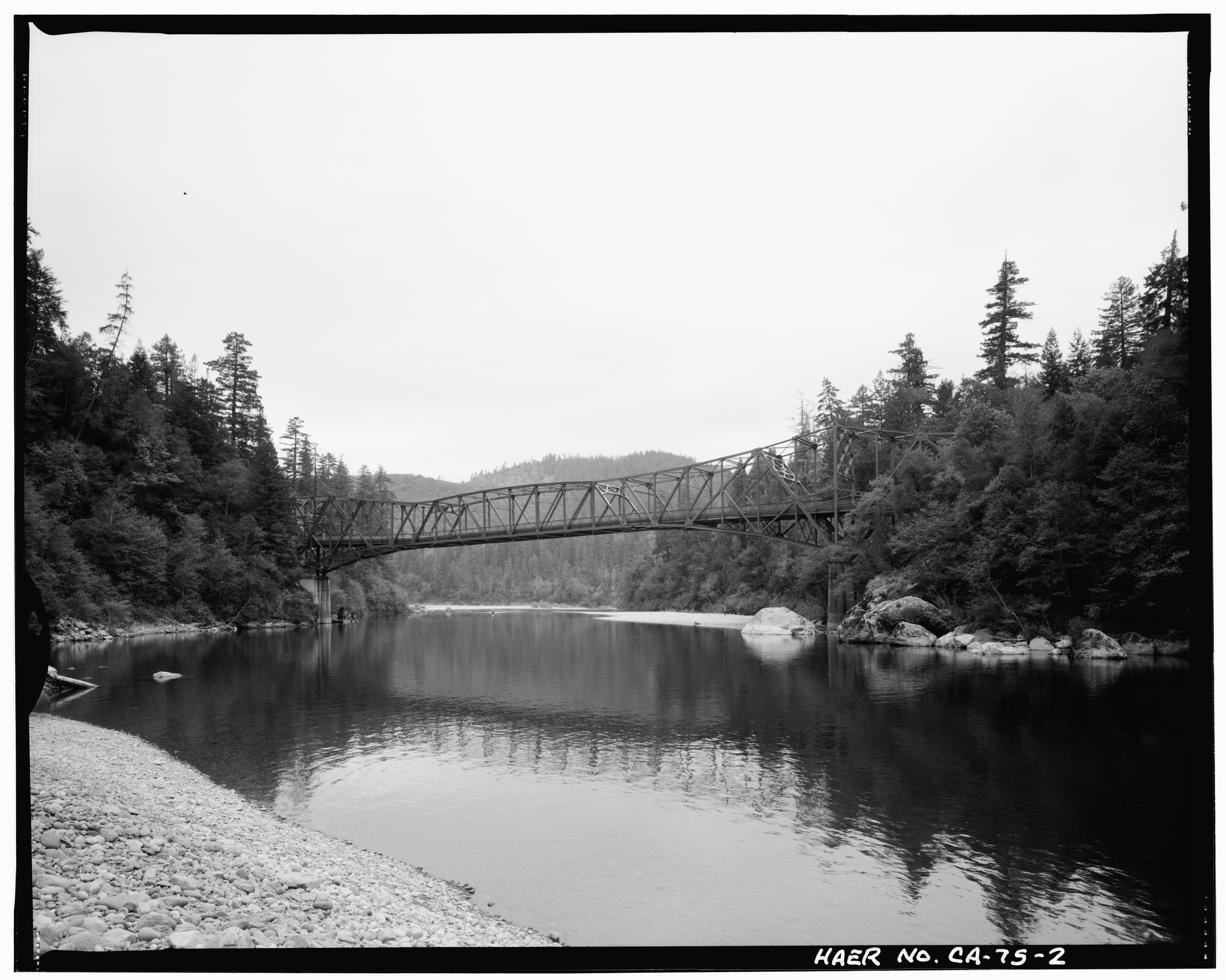
Former Smith River Bridge crossing the Lower Smith River.

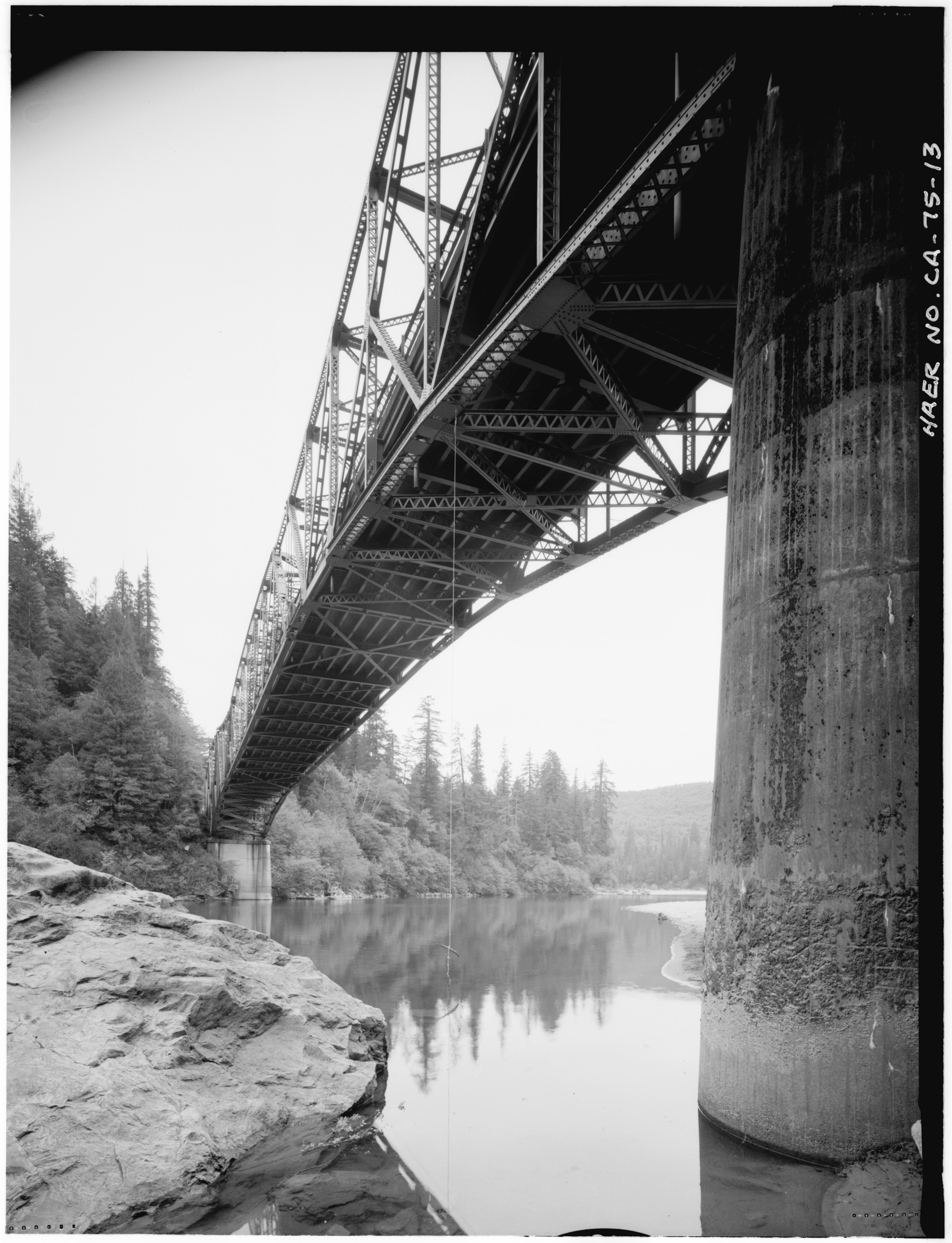
Former cantilever highway truss of Smith River Bridge.

== Crossings ==
The 1929 Smith River Bridge, also known as the Hiouchi Bridge or Bridge Wo. 1-06, was a rare example of a cantilever highway truss bridge within California, until it was demolished in 1989. The two-lane road bridge carried U.S. Highway 199 across the Smith River. The structural steel components were fabricated by Virginia Bridge & Iron Co. in Roanoke, shipped via the Panama Canal to San Francisco, then reloaded to a smaller coastal vessel and shipped to Crescent City. The suspended center span was a Parker truss.

It was the first cantilever truss type designed by the California Division of Highways Bridge Department engineers in 1928. The bridge type was briefly popular during the late 1920s to the late 1930s in the United States, but because it was best suited to specialized applications only limited numbers were built in the state. Its design was influenced by the first Carquinez Bridge, designed by David B. Steinman and completed in 1927 (demolished 2007).

Studies for the replacement of the Smith River Bridge began in 1987. U. S. Highway 199 provides a link between Highway 101 at Crescent City on the northern California coast, and Interstate Highway 5 inland at Grants Pass, Oregon. The proposal to replace the bridge was based on its functionally obsolete structural condition. Because of the high percentage of heavy truck traffic using the route, the bridge had sustained damage from high loads over the years, causing concern that the bridge was susceptible to collapsing.

Since it had been determined eligible for inclusion on the National Register of Historic Places, it was required to be documented to Historic American Engineering Record−HAER standards prior to its removal in 1989.

== In popular culture ==
For the 1983 movie Return of the Jedi, the 3rd film in the Star Wars franchise, the Smith River and its surrounding forests and the community of Smith River were used as filming locations for most of the Endor scenes, although a miniaturized set was used for the battle sequences.
