= Gasquet, California =

- Census-designated place
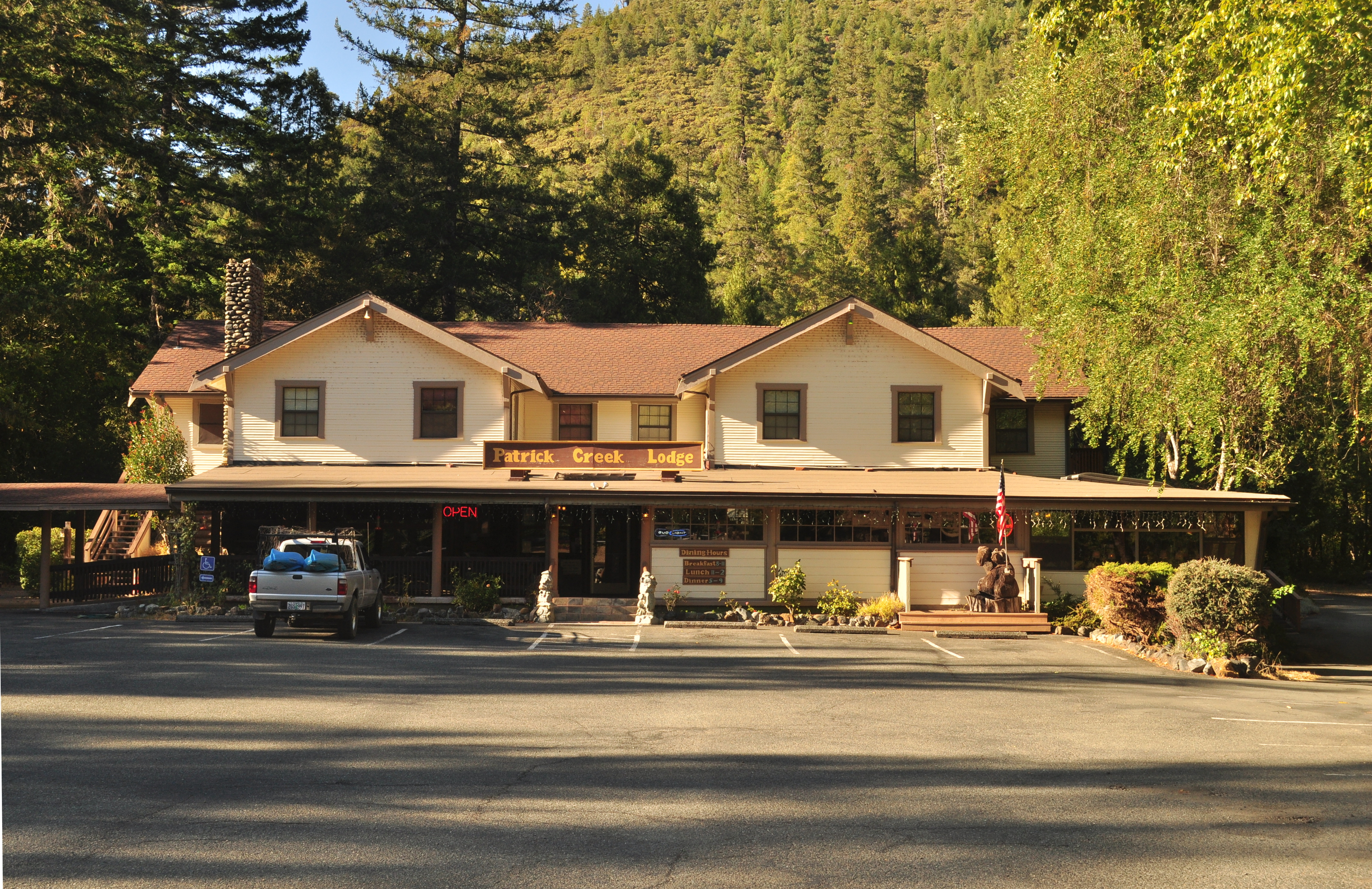
- Patrick Creek Lodge, Gasquet, California

- Location of Gasquet in Del Norte County, California

- Location in California
- Coordinates: 41°50′43″N 123°58′10″W
- Country: United States
- State: California
- County: Del Norte

Area
  - Total: 4.823 sq mi (12.491 km^{2})
  - Land: 4.756 sq mi (12.319 km^{2})
  - Water: 0.066 sq mi (0.172 km^{2}) 1.4%
- Elevation: 384 ft (117 m)

Population (2020)
  - Total: 657
  - Density: 138/sq mi (53.3/km^{2})
- Time zone: UTC-8 (Pacific (PST))
  - Summer (DST): UTC-7 (PDT)
- ZIP Code: 95543
- Area codes: 707, 369
- GNIS feature IDs: 1656041, 2611434

Gasquet (/ˈɡæs.kiː/, GAS-kee; Tolowa: Mvs-ye) is an unincorporated community in Del Norte County, California, United States, 22 mi (35 km) south of the Oregon border and 18 miles (29 km) northeast of Crescent City. The name is in honor of Horace Gasquet, who was the owner of the gold mines, hotel, railway, bank and post office, as well as the founder of Crescent City and Happy Camp. A post office operated at Gasquet from 1879 to 1902 and from 1949 to present. Gasquet is located in the Smith River National Recreation Area.

For statistical purposes, the United States Census Bureau has defined Gasquet as a census-designated place (CDP). The census definition of the area may not precisely correspond to local understanding of the area with the same name. Its population is 657 as of the 2020 census, down from 661 from the 2010 census. It lies at an elevation of 384 feet (117 m) above sea level. The ZIP Code is 95543. Its area codes are 707 and 369.

== Demographics ==
Historical population
Census	Pop.	Note	%±
2010	661		—
2020	657		−0.6%
U.S. Decennial Census; 2010

Gasquet first appeared as a census designated place in the 2010 U.S. census.

The 2020 United States census reported that Gasquet had a population of 657. The population density was 138.1 inhabitants per square mile (53.3/km^{2}). The racial makeup of Gasquet was 526 (80.1%) White, 7 (1.1%) African American, 40 (6.1%) Native American, 4 (0.6%) Asian, 1 (0.2%) Pacific Islander, 9 (1.4%) from other races, and 70 (10.7%) from two or more races. Hispanic or Latino of any race were 43 persons (6.5%).

The whole population lived in households. There were 321 households, out of which 60 (18.7%) had children under the age of 18 living in them, 151 (47.0%) were married-couple households, 25 (7.8%) were cohabiting couple households, 83 (25.9%) had a female householder with no partner present, and 62 (19.3%) had a male householder with no partner present. 105 households (32.7%) were one person, and 74 (23.1%) were one person aged 65 or older. The average household size was 2.05. There were 194 families (60.4% of all households).

The age distribution was 91 people (13.9%) under the age of 18, 21 people (3.2%) aged 18 to 24, 111 people (16.9%) aged 25 to 44, 187 people (28.5%) aged 45 to 64, and 247 people (37.6%) who were 65 years of age or older. The median age was 59.7 years. For every 100 females, there were 87.2 males.

There were 378 housing units at an average density of 79.5 units per square mile (30.7 units/km^{2}), of which 321 (84.9%) were occupied. Of these, 238 (74.1%) were owner-occupied, and 83 (25.9%) were occupied by renters.

== Politics ==
In the state legislature, Gasquet is in the 2nd senatorial district, represented by Democrat Mike McGuire, and the 2nd Assembly district, represented by Democrat Chris Rogers.

Federally, Gasquet is in California's 2nd congressional district, represented by Democrat Jared Huffman.

== Notable people ==
Retired Canadian Football League quarterback Buck Pierce was born in Gasquet, and attended school in nearby Crescent City. Pierce played nine seasons in the CFL. As of 2018, he is the quarterback coach for the Winnipeg Blue Bombers.

Pioneer Mary Adams Peacock carried the U.S. Mail from Crescent City to Grants Pass, Oregon in the 1880s and 1890s. After operating the hotels at Gasquet Village for nine years under Gasquet family management, she operated the hotels alone for 12 years until she married Pete Peacock, who ran the coach station. In 1932, when the Mary Adams Peacock Bridge across the Smith River on U.S. Route 199 near Gasquet was named, it was the first bridge in the state to be named for a woman. The bridge was built in 1926 and remodeled in 1985. Two plants, Anemone adamsiana (considered a variety of Anemonoides oregana) and Valeriana adamsiana, were named for her.

== Climate ==
Gasquet has a mediterranean climate (Csb) with mild to warm, dry summers and cool, wet winters. Its mountainside and nearby ocean location in Northern California allows it to become one of the wettest communities in the state with 91 inches (2,300 mm) of rain a year.

Climate data for Gasquet, California
Month	Jan	Feb	Mar	Apr	May	Jun	Jul	Aug	Sep	Oct	Nov	Dec	Year
Record high °F (°C)	73 (23)	76 (24)	81 (27)	88 (31)	95 (35)	101 (38)	103 (39)	102 (39)	107 (42)	95 (35)	79 (26)	71 (22)	107 (42)
Mean daily maximum °F (°C)	51.0 (10.6)	54.9 (12.7)	59.7 (15.4)	62.9 (17.2)	69.9 (21.1)	76.9 (24.9)	84.0 (28.9)	83.6 (28.7)	82.2 (27.9)	70.4 (21.3)	56.2 (13.4)	50.4 (10.2)	66.8 (19.4)
Mean daily minimum °F (°C)	38.3 (3.5)	38.6 (3.7)	39.1 (3.9)	41.1 (5.1)	45.2 (7.3)	49.3 (9.6)	52.3 (11.3)	52.1 (11.2)	48.6 (9.2)	45.3 (7.4)	41.1 (5.1)	38.2 (3.4)	44.1 (6.7)
Record low °F (°C)	22 (−6)	24 (−4)	28 (−2)	30 (−1)	32 (0)	37 (3)	40 (4)	41 (5)	36 (2)	29 (−2)	25 (−4)	19 (−7)	19 (−7)
Average precipitation inches (mm)	14.02 (356)	12.38 (314)	11.77 (299)	7.58 (193)	4.40 (112)	2.00 (51)	0.35 (8.9)	0.50 (13)	1.49 (38)	5.63 (143)	12.99 (330)	17.62 (448)	90.73 (2,305)
Average snowfall inches (cm)	0 (0)	0.7 (1.8)	0.1 (0.25)	0.3 (0.76)	0 (0)	0 (0)	0 (0)	0 (0)	0 (0)	0 (0)	0 (0)	0 (0)	1.1 (2.8)
Average precipitation days (≥ 0.01 in)	16.7	13.8	16.1	13.0	8.7	5.3	1.6	1.8	3.9	8.1	14.8	16.9	120.7
Source: The Weather Channel — NOAA (precipitation) — PRISM (average temperatures)
