= Del Norte County, California =

County in California, United States

Coordinates: 41.74°N 123.96°W

Del Norte County
- County
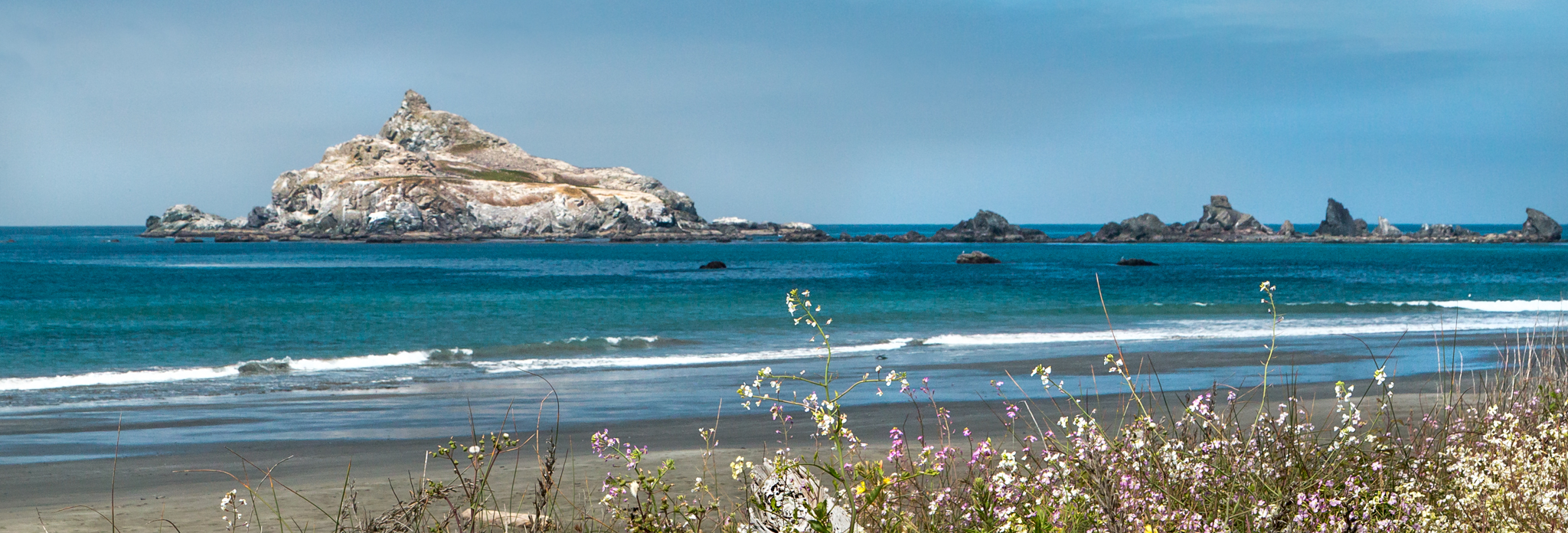
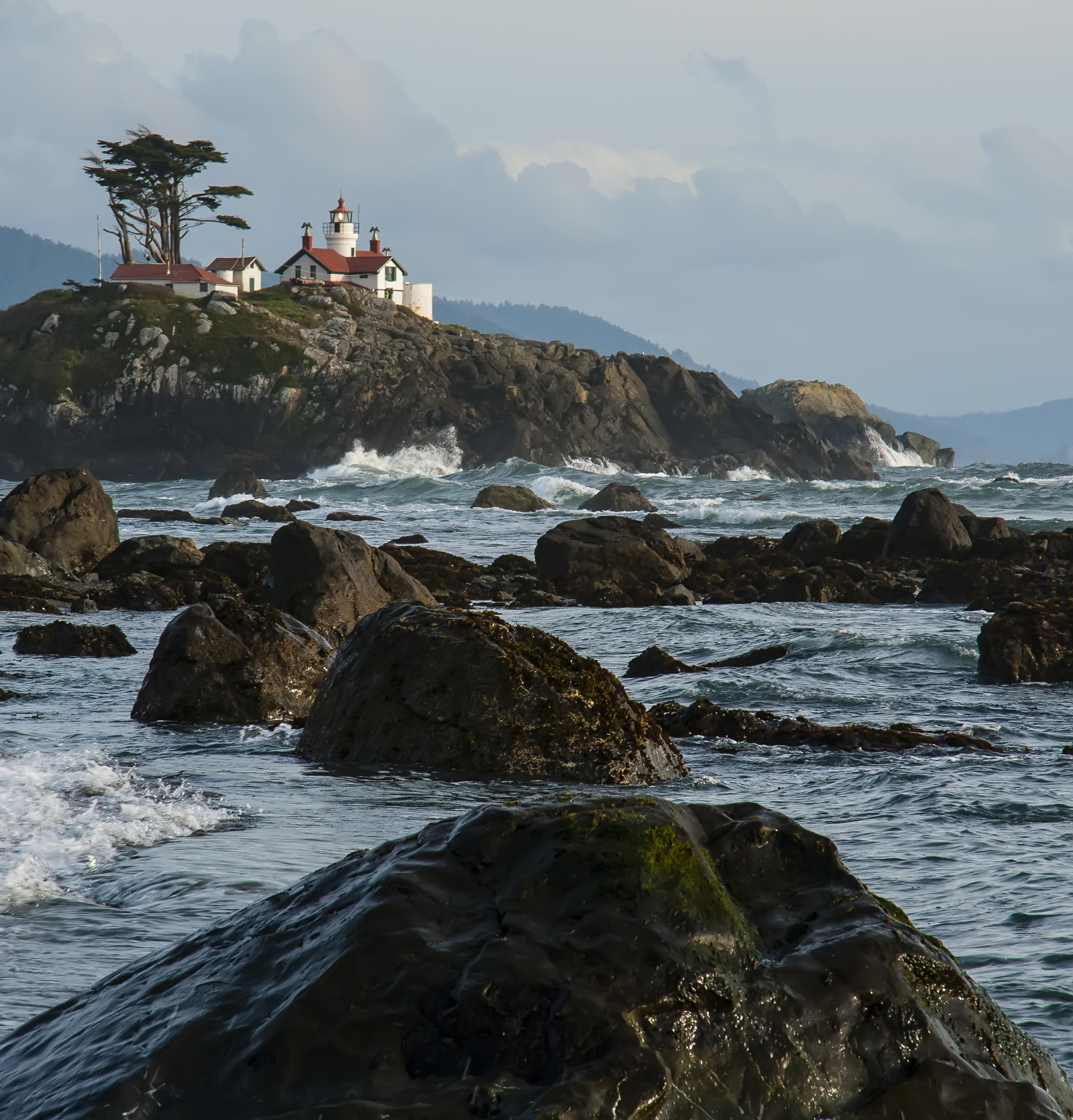
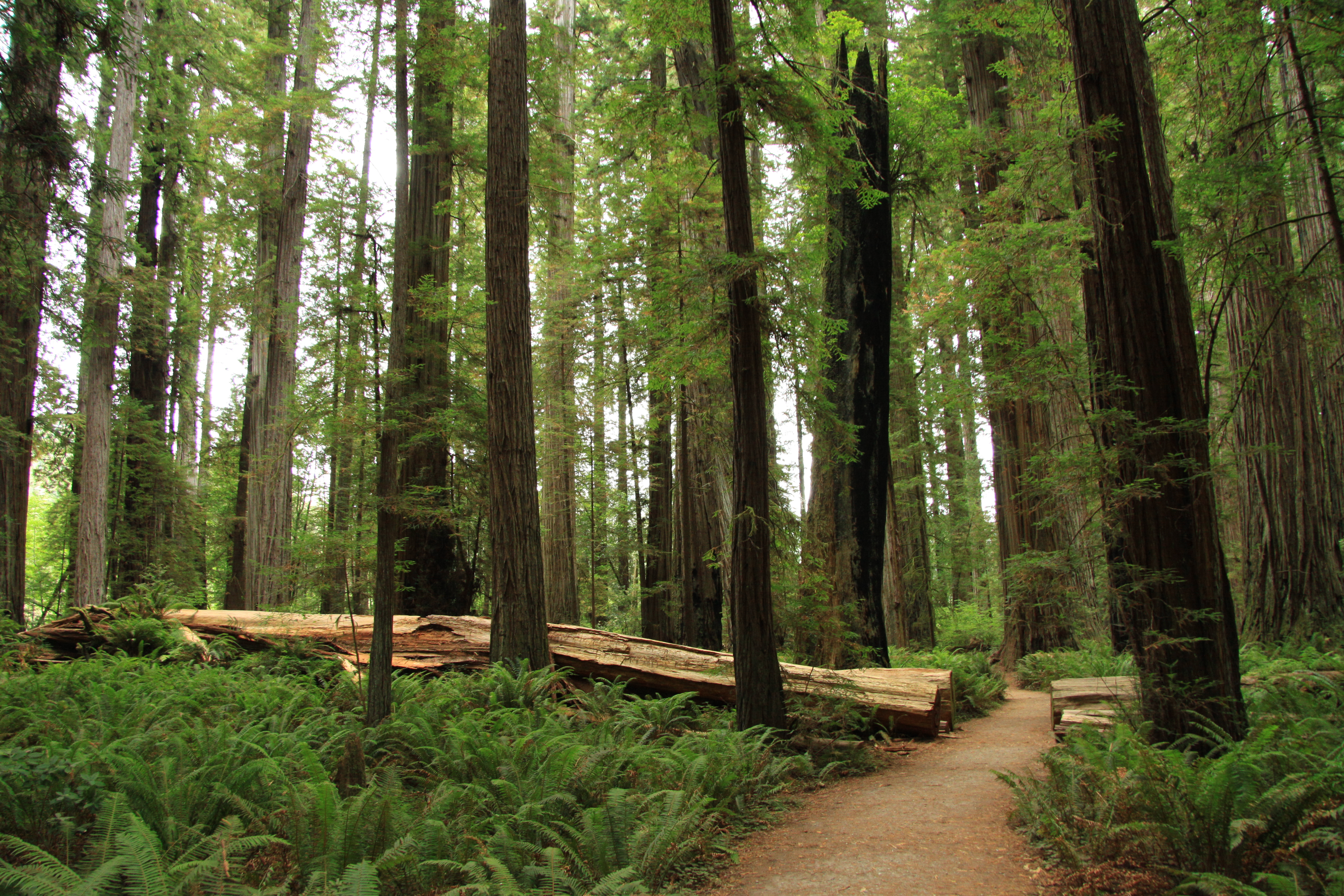
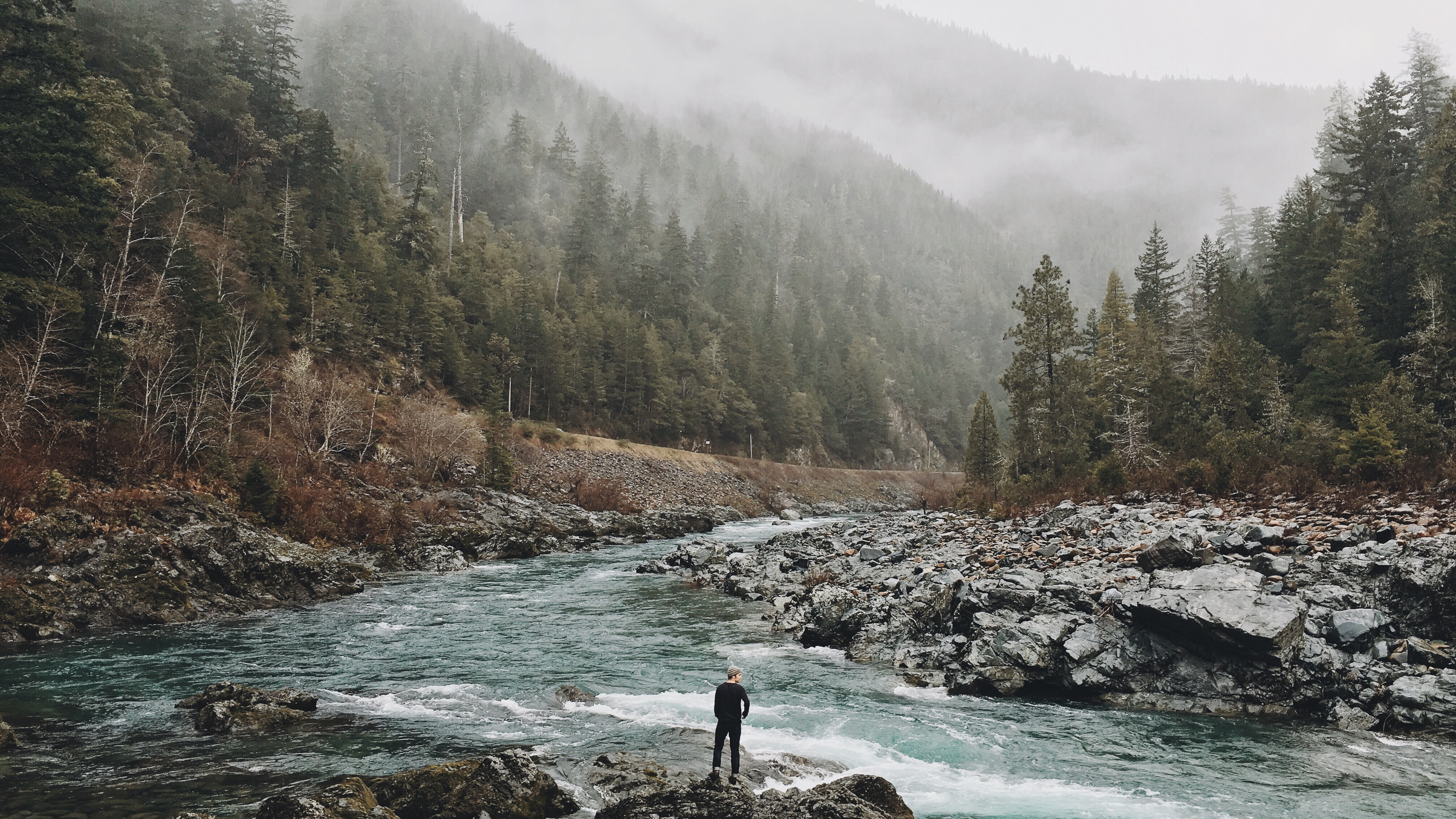
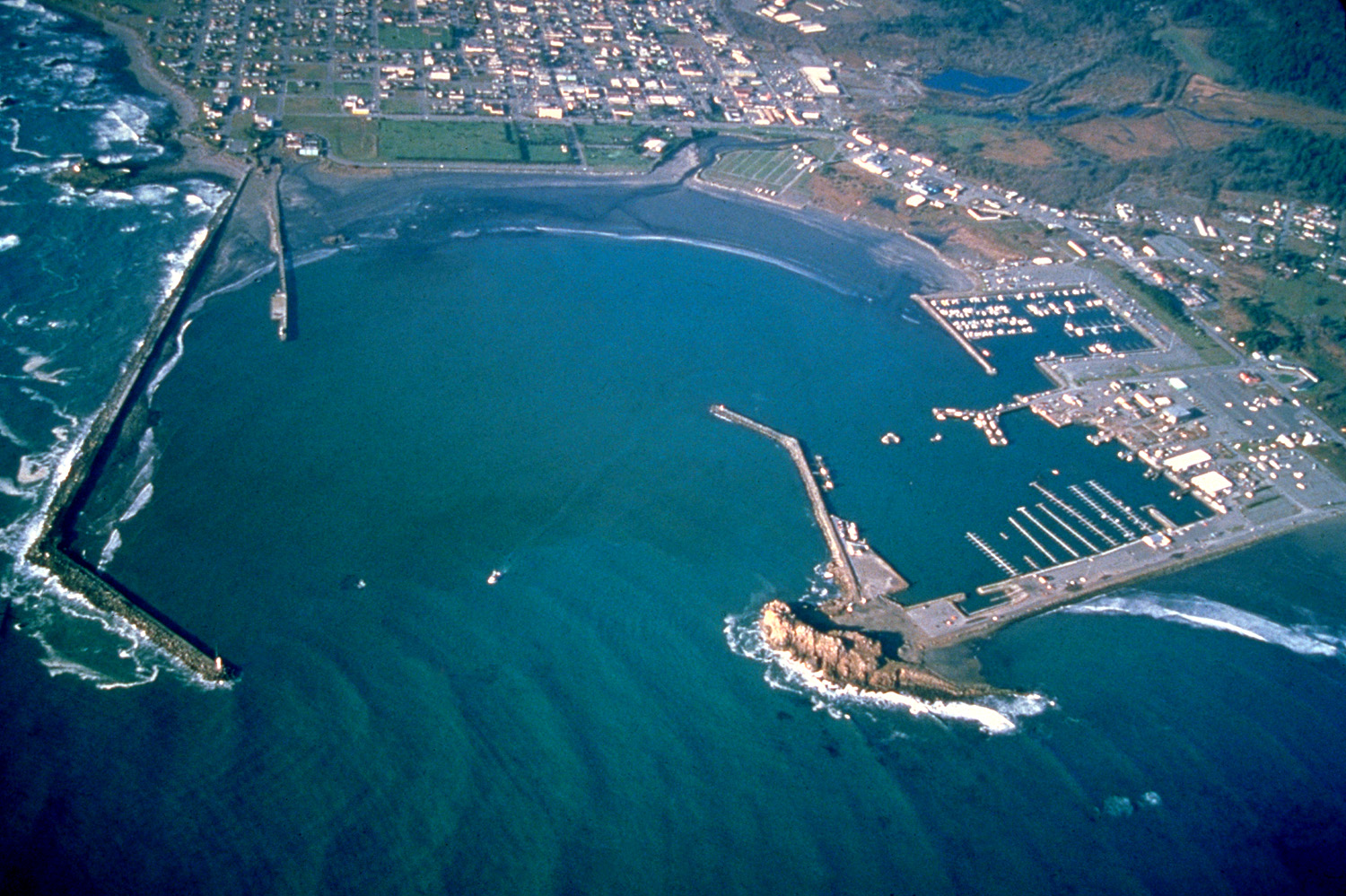
- Castle Rock National Wildlife Refuge Battery Point Light Jedediah Smith Redwoods Smith River Crescent City

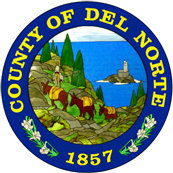
- Seal
- Interactive map of Del Norte County
- Location in the state of California
- Country: United States
- State: California
- Region: North Coast
- Incorporated: March 2, 1857
- Named for: Its location, "Of the North" (Spanish: Del norte), in California
- County seat: Crescent City
- Largest city: Crescent City

Government
  - Type: Council–CAO
  - Chair: Joey Borges
  - Vice Chair: Darrin Short
  - Board of Supervisors: Supervisors: Darrin Short; Valerie Starkey; Chris Howard; Joey Borges; Dean Wilson
  - County Administrative Officer: Neal Lopez

Area
  - Total: 1,230 sq mi (3,200 km^{2})
  - Land: 1,006 sq mi (2,610 km^{2})
  - Water: 223 sq mi (580 km^{2})
- Highest elevation: 6,415 ft (1,955 m)

Population (April 1, 2020)
  - Total: 27,743
  - Estimate (2025): 26,410 ▼
  - Density: 27.58/sq mi (10.65/km^{2})

GDP
  - Total: $0.947 billion (2022)
- Time zone: UTC-08:00 (PST)
  - Summer (DST): UTC-07:00 (PDT)
- Area codes: 707
- FIPS code: 06-015
- GNIS feature ID: 1682074
- Congressional district: 2nd
- Website: co.del-norte.ca.us

Del Norte County (/dɛl ˈnɔːrt/; Spanish: [del ˈnoɾte]; Spanish for 'Of the North') is a county located at the far northwest corner of the U.S. state of California, along the Pacific Ocean adjacent to the Oregon border. Its population was 27,743 as of the 2020 census, down from 28,610 from the 2010 census. The county seat and only incorporated city is Crescent City. Del Norte was settled and colonized by Azorean Portuguese settlers and dairy farmers, which may account for the local pronunciation of the county name. Locals pronounce the county name as Del Nort, not Del Nor-teh as would be expected in Spanish. Del Norte County comprises the Crescent City, CA Micropolitan Statistical Area. The rural county is notable for forests containing giant Coast Redwoods, with some attaining heights over 350 feet (110 m). This northernmost county on the California coast also has scores of unique plants and flowers, dozens of species of coastal birds and fish, rocky primitive beaches and sea stacks, pristine rivers and historic lighthouses.

== History ==
The area that is now known as Del Norte was (and still is) inhabited by the Yurok and Tolowa Nations of indigenous peoples. The first European American to explore this land was pioneer Jedediah Smith in the early-19th century. He was the first European American to reach the area overland on foot in a time before the European Americans knew anything about such a distant territory. For him it was literally "Land's End" — where the American continent ended at the Pacific Ocean. In 1855 Congress authorized the building of a lighthouse at "the battery point" (a high tide island on the coast of Crescent City) which is still functioning as a historical landmark.

Del Norte County was established in 1857, from part of the territory of Klamath County following the great California Gold Rush. Klamath County itself ceased to exist in 1874.

== Geography ==
According to the U.S. Census Bureau, the county has a total area of 1,230 square miles (3,200 km^{2}), of which 1,006 square miles (2,610 km^{2}) is land and 223 square miles (580 km^{2}) (18%) is water.

The mountainous terrain associated with the Coastal Range and the Klamath Mountains dominates Del Norte County's geography. Elevation ranges from sea level to over 6,400 feet. Although much of the county is made up of steep terrain, there are small patches of flat terrain along the coast and in isolated mountain valleys. There are 37 miles of coastline in the county, forming a coastal zone that covers approximately 51,000 acres (80 square miles). A broad coastal plain can be found in the northwest portion of the county with the western edge of the Coastal Range as its easterly boundary. Rising abruptly from the coastal plain, the Coastal Range extends north into Oregon and is situated next to the Klamath Mountains to the east.

=== Adjacent counties ===
- Curry County, Oregon - northwest
- Josephine County, Oregon - northeast
- Siskiyou County - east
- Humboldt County - south

=== Beach ===
- Pelican State Beach

=== Recreation area ===
- Smith River National Recreation Area

=== Rivers ===
- Klamath - one of the longest in California.
- Smith - a crown jewel of the National Wild and Scenic River program.

=== Wildlife refuge ===
- Castle Rock National Wildlife Refuge

=== Parks ===
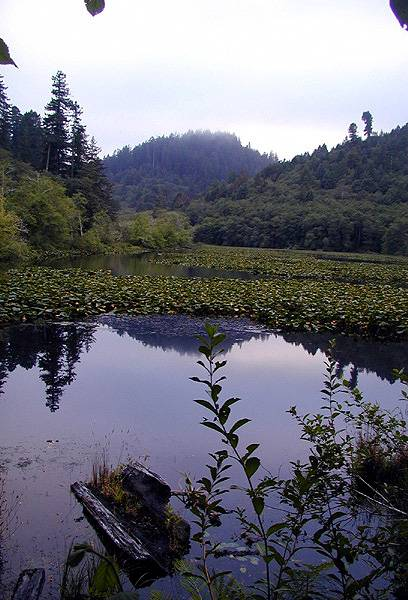
Marshall Pond near the Klamath River, Redwood National, and State parks.

- Del Norte Coast Redwoods State Park
- Jedediah Smith Redwoods State Park
- Redwood National Park
- Tolowa Dunes State Park
- Ruby Van Deventer County Park
- Florence Keller County Park

=== Ecology ===
There is a diversity of flora and fauna within Del Norte County. Vegetative plant associations feature several forest types including mixed oak forest. The California endemic Blue oak, Quercus douglasii is at the northernmost part of its range in Del Norte County. The Black Oak and Douglas-fir are also found in Del Norte County.

== Demographics ==
Historical population
Census	Pop.	Note	%±
1860	1,993		—
1870	2,022		1.5%
1880	2,584		27.8%
1890	2,592		0.3%
1900	2,408		−7.1%
1910	2,417		0.4%
1920	2,759		14.1%
1930	4,739		71.8%
1940	4,745		0.1%
1950	8,078		70.2%
1960	17,771		120.0%
1970	14,580		−18.0%
1980	18,217		24.9%
1990	23,460		28.8%
2000	27,507		17.3%
2010	28,610		4.0%
2020	27,743		−3.0%
2025 (est.)	26,410	▼	−4.8%
U.S. Decennial Census; 1790–1960 1900–1990; 1990–2000 2010–2015

=== 2020 census ===
As of the 2020 census, the county had a population of 27,743. The median age was 40.2 years, with 20.5% of residents under the age of 18 and 18.9% of residents 65 years of age or older. For every 100 females there were 118.3 males, and for every 100 females age 18 and over there were 123.6 males age 18 and over.

The racial makeup of the county was 62.0% White, 3.1% Black or African American, 8.8% American Indian and Alaska Native, 3.0% Asian, 0.2% Native Hawaiian and Pacific Islander, 10.6% from some other race, and 12.4% from two or more races. Hispanic or Latino residents of any race comprised 19.2% of the population.

56.3% of residents lived in urban areas, while 43.7% lived in rural areas.

There were 9,807 households in the county, of which 29.5% had children under the age of 18 living with them and 28.1% had a female householder with no spouse or partner present. About 28.9% of all households were made up of individuals and 14.0% had someone living alone who was 65 years of age or older.

There were 11,090 housing units, of which 11.6% were vacant. Among occupied housing units, 63.1% were owner-occupied and 36.9% were renter-occupied. The homeowner vacancy rate was 1.9% and the rental vacancy rate was 5.1%.

=== Racial and ethnic composition ===
Del Norte County, California – Racial and ethnic composition Note: the US Census treats Hispanic/Latino as an ethnic category. This table excludes Latinos from the racial categories and assigns them to a separate category. Hispanics/Latinos may be of any race.
Race / Ethnicity (NH = Non-Hispanic)	Pop 1980	Pop 1990	Pop 2000	Pop 2010	Pop 2020	% 1980	% 1990	% 2000	% 2010	% 2020
White alone (NH)	15,729	18,302	19,294	18,513	16,262	86.34%	78.01%	70.14%	64.71%	58.62%
Black or African American alone (NH)	52	853	1,167	967	841	0.29%	3.64%	4.24%	3.38%	3.03%
Native American or Alaska Native alone (NH)	1,301	1,415	1,593	1,935	2,136	7.14%	6.03%	5.79%	6.76%	7.70%
Asian alone (NH)	83	433	619	938	826	0.46%	1.85%	2.25%	3.28%	2.98%
Native Hawaiian or Pacific Islander alone (NH)	x	x	18	26	28	0.07%	0.09%	0.07%	0.09%	0.10%
Other race alone (NH)	34	43	39	172	122	0.19%	0.18%	0.14%	0.60%	0.44%
Mixed race or Multiracial (NH)	x	x	948	966	2,207	x	x	3.45%	3.38%	7.96%
Hispanic or Latino (any race)	1,018	2,414	3,829	5,093	5,321	5.59%	10.29%	13.92%	17.80%	19.18%
Total	18,217	23,460	27,507	28,610	27,743	100.00%	100.00%	100.00%	100.00%	100.00%

=== American Community Survey 2025 data ===
The United States Census Bureau estimated that in 2025, Del Norte County’s population was 26.410. It was also estimated that the county's population was 58,08% Non-Hispanic White, 21,91% Hispanic or Latino, 2,79% Non-Hispanic Black, 3,15% Asian, 7,57% Native American, 0,14% Pacific Islander, and 6,36% Multiracial.

Total	Population	Percentage
Non-Hispanic White	15.339	58,08%
Hispanic or Latino	5.787	21,91%
Non-Hispanic Black	738	2,79%
Asian	833	3,15%
Native American	1.998	7,57%
Pacific Islander	36	0,14%
Non-Hispanic Multiracial	1.679	6,36%

=== 2010 census ===
The 2010 United States census reported that Del Norte County had a population of 28,610. The racial makeup of Del Norte County was 21,098 (73.7%) White, 993 (3.5%) African American, 2,244 (7.8%) Native American, 965 (3.4%) Asian, 32 (0.1%) Pacific Islander, 1,980 (6.9%) from other races, and 1,298 (4.5%) from two or more races. Hispanic or Latino of any race were 5,093 persons (17.8%).

Population reported at 2010 United States census
The County	Total; Population	White	African; American	Native; American	Asian	Pacific; Islander	other races	two or more races	Hispanic or Latino (of any race)
Del Norte County	28,610	21,098	993	2,244	965	32	1,980	1,298	5,093
Incorporated city	Total; Population	White	African; American	Native; American	Asian	Pacific; Islander	other races	two or more races	Hispanic or Latino (of any race)
Crescent City	7,643	5,052	910	370	333	7	696	275	2,342
Census-designated places	Total; Population	White	African; American	Native; American	Asian	Pacific; Islander	other races	two or more races	Hispanic or Latino (of any race)
Bertsch-Oceanview	2,436	1,810	3	294	94	0	81	154	310
Gasquet	661	585	2	27	1	1	15	30	39
Hiouchi	301	267	0	11	6	2	8	7	11
Klamath	779	379	1	325	3	0	5	66	90
Smith River	866	528	1	59	5	0	234	39	293
Unincorporated communities	Total; Population	White	African; American	Native; American	Asian	Pacific; Islander	other races	two or more races	Hispanic or Latino (of any race)
All others not CDPs (combined)	15,924	12,477	76	1,158	523	22	941	727	2,008

=== 2000 census ===
As of the census of 2000, there were 27,507 people, 9,170 households, and 6,290 families residing in the county. The population density was 27 people per square mile (10 people/km^{2}). There were 10,434 housing units at an average density of 10 per square mile (3.9/km^{2}). The racial makeup of the county was 78.9% White, 4.3% Black or African American, 6.4% Native American, 2.3% Asian, 0.1% Pacific Islander, 3.9% from other races, and 4.1% from two or more races. 13.9% of the population were Hispanic or Latino of any race. 16.2% were of German, 11.3% English, 9.1% Irish and 7.4% American ancestry according to Census 2000. 91.6% spoke English and 6.2% Spanish as their first language.

There were 9,170 households, out of which 33.5% had children under the age of 18 living with them, 50.0% were married couples living together, 13.6% had a female householder with no husband present, and 31.4% were non-families. 25.3% of all households were made up of individuals, and 10.1% had someone living alone who was 65 years of age or older. The average household size was 2.58 and the average family size was 3.08.

The age distribution was 25.1% under the age of 18, 8.0% from 18 to 24, 32.2% from 25 to 44, 22.3% from 45 to 64, and 12.5% who were 65 years of age or older. The median age was 36 years. For every 100 females there were 123.3 males. For every 100 females age 18 and over, there were 130.3 males.

The median income for a household in the county was $29,642, and the median income for a family was $36,056. Males had a median income of $40,072 versus $22,212 for females. The per capita income for the county was $14,573. About 16.4% of families and 20.2% of the population were below the poverty line, including 26.7% of those under age 18 and 8.2% of those age 65 or over.

== Education ==
Del Norte County is home to a satellite campus of College of the Redwoods, a two-year college based in Humboldt County.

Del Norte County has one of just five combined county office of education-unified school district learning educational agencies (LEA) in the state of California, with one elected Board of Trustees that serves both agencies, and one superintendent overseeing both the County Office of Education, and the Unified School District.

The Del Norte County Unified School District, which covers the entire county, provides public education from pre-Kindergarten through the twelfth grade. The only high school in Del Norte County is Del Norte High School, whose school mascot is the Warrior. There are also five K-5 elementary schools (Bess Maxwell, Joe Hamilton, Margaret Keating, Mary Peacock, Pine Grove), three K-8 elementary schools (Mountain, Redwood, Smith River), and one middle school (Crescent Elk).

The County Office of Education provides special education services to the county, as well as alternative learning options that includes Community Day and juvenile detention. Alternative educational facilities are Del Norte Community Day, Elk Creek detention center, and Sunset Continuation High School.

Del Norte County has several private parochial schools and charter schools.

== Politics ==
United States presidential election results for Del Norte County, California
Year	Republican		Democratic		Third party(ies)	
Year	No.	%	No.	%	No.	%
1892	235	36.55%	339	52.72%	69	10.73%
1896	345	49.50%	334	47.92%	18	2.58%
1900	334	51.78%	291	45.12%	20	3.10%
1904	429	60.17%	187	26.23%	97	13.60%
1908	450	59.29%	202	26.61%	107	14.10%
1912	0	0.00%	323	38.32%	520	61.68%
1916	499	43.81%	471	41.35%	169	14.84%
1920	596	62.61%	279	29.31%	77	8.09%
1924	530	52.63%	122	12.12%	355	35.25%
1928	771	55.87%	599	43.41%	10	0.72%
1932	637	30.94%	1,319	64.06%	103	5.00%
1936	853	39.24%	1,292	59.43%	29	1.33%
1940	1,233	53.56%	1,034	44.92%	35	1.52%
1944	1,011	55.25%	818	44.70%	1	0.05%
1948	1,541	54.26%	1,172	41.27%	127	4.47%
1952	2,938	63.44%	1,640	35.41%	53	1.14%
1956	2,918	53.18%	2,552	46.51%	17	0.31%
1960	3,024	48.05%	3,225	51.24%	45	0.71%
1964	2,075	36.23%	3,652	63.77%	0	0.00%
1968	2,387	46.19%	2,236	43.27%	545	10.55%
1972	2,927	51.82%	2,156	38.17%	565	10.00%
1976	2,481	45.29%	2,789	50.91%	208	3.80%
1980	4,016	57.48%	2,338	33.46%	633	9.06%
1984	3,996	58.41%	2,696	39.41%	149	2.18%
1988	3,714	49.73%	3,587	48.03%	167	2.24%
1992	3,083	32.96%	3,639	38.91%	2,631	28.13%
1996	3,670	41.29%	3,652	41.08%	1,567	17.63%
2000	4,526	54.57%	3,117	37.58%	651	7.85%
2004	5,356	56.85%	3,892	41.31%	173	1.84%
2008	4,967	52.11%	4,323	45.36%	241	2.53%
2012	4,614	52.61%	3,791	43.23%	365	4.16%
2016	5,134	53.71%	3,485	36.46%	939	9.82%
2020	6,461	56.41%	4,677	40.84%	315	2.75%
2024	5,999	56.78%	4,266	40.38%	300	2.84%

Del Norte is traditionally a strongly Republican county in Presidential and congressional elections. The last Democrat to win a majority in the county was Jimmy Carter in 1976; even so, Bill Clinton received a plurality in 1992. In 2016, with Orange County flipping, Del Norte County became the only county on California's coast to vote for Donald Trump over Hillary Clinton. As of 2024, it is now the only county on California's coast that votes Republican for President.

Gubernatorial elections results

Gubernatorial elections results
Year	Republican	Democratic
2022	61.0% 5,111	39.0% 3,264
2018	58.7% 4,887	41.3% 3,441
2014	50.4% 3,539	49.6% 3,488
2010	41.2% 3,373	50.0% 4,093
2006	54.9% 3,639	38.2% 2,531
2002	45.8% 3,093	43.3% 2,922
1998	41.5% 3,087	51.3% 3,820
1994	61.8% 4,626	31.7% 2,372
1990	53.2% 3,615	40.0% 2,717
1986	65.8% 4,213	31.6% 2,026
1982	51.3% 3,355	44.9% 2,934
1978	49.9% 2,933	41.7% 2,451
1974	46.1% 1,921	51.6% 2,149
1970	57.1% 2,755	41.0% 1,977
1966	64.0% 3,409	36.0% 1,918
1962	45.9% 2,418	52.0% 2,741

In line with its voting habits, Del Norte's registered voting population is heavily Republican. As of October 2024, approximately 83% of eligible voters are registered to vote in Del Norte County, with approximately 29% registered as Democrats and approximately 41% registered as Republicans.

Del Norte County is in California's 2nd congressional district, represented by Democrat Jared Huffman.

In the State Assembly, Del Norte County is in the 2nd Assembly district, represented by Democrat Chris Rogers. In the State Senate, the county is in the 2nd senatorial district, represented by Democrat Mike McGuire.

=== Voter registration statistics ===
Population and registered voters
Total population	28,561	
Registered voters (Note: Percentage of registered voters with respect to total population. Percentages of party members with respect to registered voters follow.)	12,239	42.9%
Democratic	4,252	34.7%
Republican	4,595	37.5%
Democratic–Republican spread	-343	-2.8%
American Independent	541	4.4%
Green	100	0.8%
Libertarian	90	0.7%
Peace and Freedom	49	0.4%
Americans Elect	0	0.0%
Other	150	1.2%
No party preference	2,462	20.1%

==== Cities by population and voter registration ====
Cities by population and voter registration
City	Population	Registered voters	Democratic	Republican	D–R spread	Other	No party preference
Crescent City	7,673	22.3%	35.5%	29.4%	+6.1%	15.3%	25.5%

== Crime ==
The following table includes the number of incidents reported and the rate per 1,000 persons for each type of offense.

Population and crime rates
Population	28,561	
Violent crime	108	3.78
Homicide	1	0.04
Forcible rape	22	0.77
Robbery	11	0.39
Aggravated assault	74	2.59
Property crime	398	13.94
Burglary	230	8.05
Larceny-theft	340	11.90
Motor vehicle theft	73	2.56
Arson	5	0.18

=== Cities by population and crime rates ===
Cities by population and crime rates
City	Population	Violent crimes	Violent crime rate per 1,000 persons	Property crimes	Property crime rate per 1,000 persons
Crescent City	7,723	51	6.60	215	27.84

== Transportation ==
=== Major highways ===
- U.S. Route 101 – Last Chance Grade
- U.S. Route 199
- State Route 169
- State Route 197

=== Public transportation ===
Local public transit is provided by Redwood Coast Transit, which provides access to Amtrak passenger train (via Amtrak Thruway) service.

=== Airports ===
Advanced Air conducts passenger flights to and from Jack McNamara Field Airport, operating one daily round trip flight to Oakland International Airport and Los Angeles-Hawthorne Airport. Flights are largely subsidized by an Alternate Essential Air Service grant approved by the United States Department of Transportation and issued to the Border Coast Regional Airport Authority in 2020.

=== Harbor ===
The Crescent City Harbor serves as a commercial fishing port for salmon, shrimp, tuna, cod, and dungeness crab commercial fishing boats. Nearly 50% of all dungeness crab served in California restaurants is off-loaded in this harbor. The harbor is also home to multiple fishing and non-fishing related businesses and harbor governmental offices. The harbor also has several pleasure boat docks.

== Communities ==
Crescent City is the county seat of and the only incorporated city in Del Norte County. Its population count includes the inmates of Pelican Bay State Prison located ten miles north of the city.

=== Cities ===
- Crescent City

=== Census-designated places ===
- Bertsch–Oceanview
- Fort Dick
- Gasquet
- Hiouchi
- Klamath
- Smith River
- Crescent City North – former CDP

=== Other unincorporated communities ===
- Adams Station
- Darlingtonia
- Klamath Glen
- Pacific Shores
- Requa
- Scaath
- Yontocket

=== Population ranking ===
The population ranking of the following table is based on the 2020 census of Del Norte County.

† county seat

Rank	City/Town/etc.	Municipal type	Population (2020 Census)
1	† Crescent City	City	6,673
2	Bertsch-Oceanview	CDP	2,520
3	Yurok Reservation (partially in Humboldt County)	AIAN	1,236
4	Klamath	CDP	1,088
5	Fort Dick	CDP	912
6	Smith River	CDP	906
7	Gasquet	CDP	657
8	Hiouchi	CDP	314
9	Smith River Rancheria	AIAN	160
10	Elk Valley Rancheria	AIAN	100
11	Resighini Rancheria	AIAN	33

== See also ==
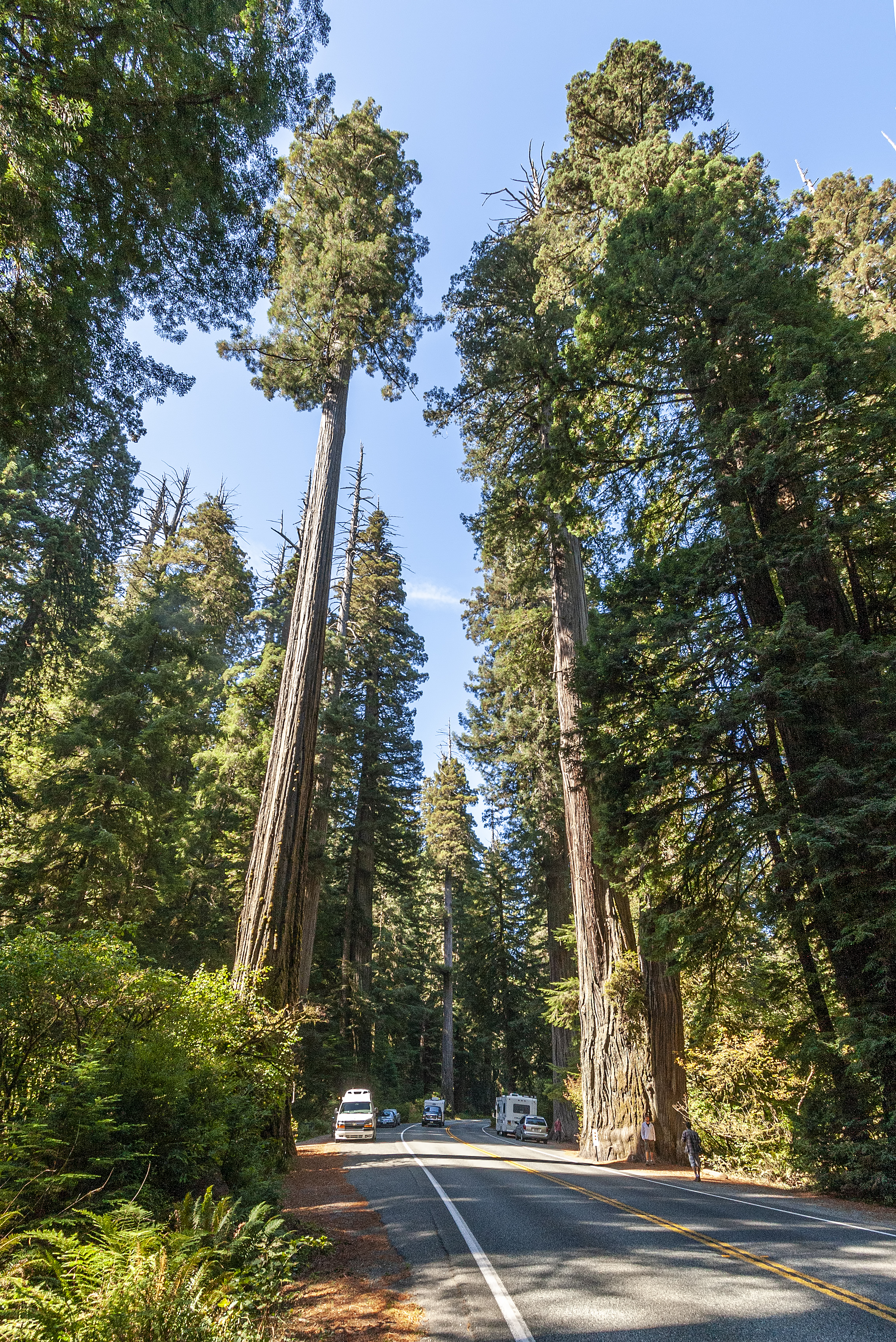
U.S. Route 199 in California, the Redwood Highway, at Jedediah Smith Redwoods State Park in Del Norte County, near Crescent City, California.

- Hiking trails in Del Norte County
- National Register of Historic Places listings in Del Norte County, California
- Things to Do, Outdoor Recreation & Visitor Information
